In Malta most of the main roads are in the outskirts of the localities to connect one urban area with another urban area. The most important roads are those that connect the south of the island with the northern part, like Tal-Barrani Road, Aldo Moro Street in Marsa (the widest road in Malta) and Birkirkara Bypass (the busiest road in Malta).

Traffic in Malta drives on the left. Car ownership in Malta is excessively high, given the islands' small size. In 1990, there were 182,254 registered cars, giving an automobile density of 582 per km2. In 2009, the country had the fifth-highest number of vehicles per capita in the world, with 607 motor vehicles per 1,000 people. At the end of March 2022, the number of licensed motor vehicles reached 414,669.

Malta has 3,096 kilometres of road, 2,704 km (87.3%) of which are paved and 392 km are unpaved as of 2008. The official road user guide for Malta is The Highway Code.

Route Network in Malta

Route 1

From Ċirkewwa (Il-Mellieħa) to Birżebbuġa: 
Ċirkewwa – Gozo Ferry Terminal 
Triq il-Marfa (Marfa Road) – passes from Marfa, Wied Musa Bay, Red Tower area to Għadira Beach (Mellieħa Bay)
Dawret il-Mellieħa (Mellieħa Bypass) – leading from Għadira Beach (Mellieħa Bay), Popeye Village (Anchor Bay), San Niklaw to Ta' Pennellu in Il-Mellieħa
Triq Louis Wettinger – leading from Ta' Pennellu (Il-Mellieħa) to Selmun Palace area
It-Telgħa ta' Selmun (Selmun Hill) – leading from Il-Mellieħa to Mistra Battery area
Triq il-Mistra (Mistra Road) – leading from Mistra Battery area to Daħlet il-Fekruna Bay, Xemxija (San Pawl il-Baħar)
Telgħet ix-Xemxija (Xemxija Hill) – the main road of Xemxija (San Pawl il-Baħar (from Daħlet il-Fekruna Bay to Pwales)
Xatt il-Pwales (Pwales Beach) – near Simar, Xemxija 
part of Triq Għajn Tuffieħa (Golden Bay Road) – leading from Xemxija to Għajn Tuffieħa (near The Olympic Garden)
Dawret San Pawl (St. Paul's Bay Bypass) – leading from Xemxija and Tal-Fjuri area to Tal-Erba' Mwieżeb area in Buġibba (San Pawl il-Baħar)
Kennedy Drive – leading from Tal-Erba' Mwieżeb area in Buġibba to Kennedy Groce and Salina Bay, In-Naxxar 
Triq is-Salini (Salina Road) – leading from Salina Bay to Għallis, Magħtab, Qalet Marku Bay and Baħar iċ-Ċagħaq
Tul il-Kosta (Coast Road) – leading from Baħar iċ-Ċagħaq and San Ġwann Evanġelista area to Is-Swieqi, Madliena and St Patrick's in Pembroke, Malta 
Triq Sant' Andrija (St. Andrews' Road) – leading from Is-Swieqi, High Ridge, Madliena and Pembroke, Malta to Paceville and San Ġiljan
Triq Mikiel Anton Vassalli (Regional Road) – leading from Paceville and San Ġiljan to San Ġwann, Tas-Sliema, Il-Gżira and University of Malta (L-Imsida)
Triq Reġjonali (Regional Road) – leading from L-Imsida and University of Malta (Tal-Qroqq) to Santa Venera and Ħal Qormi 
Dawret il-Marsa u l-Ħamrun (Marsa-Ħamrun Bypass) – leading from Santa Venera to Il-Ħamrun, Qormi and Il-Marsa 
Triq Diċembru Tlettax (13 December Road) – leading from Il-Marsa to Blata l-Bajda (Il-Ħamrun) and Floriana, Malta/Valletta 
Triq it-Tiġrija (Racecourse Street) – leading from Il-Marsa to Albert Town 
Triq Aldo Moro (Aldo Moro Street) – leading from Il-Marsa and Albert Town to Marsa Industrial Estate, Addolorata and Paola, Malta
Triq il-Labour (Labour Road) – leading from Albert Town to Paola, Malta and Ħal Luqa 
Triq il-Gvern Lokali (Local Government Street) – leading from Ħal Luqa to Ħal Qormi and Albert Town 
Triq Ġużè Gatt (G. Gatt Street) – leading from Marsa Industrial Estate to Ħal Qormi and Albert Town 
Triq Giuseppe Garibaldi (Garibaldi Avenue) – leading from Paola, Malta and Addolorata to Ħal Luqa, Santa Luċija and Malta International Airport 
Triq il-Kunsill tal-Ewropa (Council of Europe Street) – leading from Ħal Tarxien and Santa Luċija to Ħal Luqa and Malta International Airport 
Vjal l-Avjazzjoni (Aviation Avenue) – leading from Ħal Luqa to Malta International Airport and Il-Gudja
Triq Ħal Far (Ħal Far Road) – leading from Malta International Airport and Il-Gudja to Ħas-Saptan (Ħal Għaxaq) and Ħal Far 
Triq Ħal Far, Birżebbuġa (Ħal Far Road) – leading from Ħal Far to Birżebbuġa and Malta Freeport 
Kalafrana (Calafrana) – Malta Freeport (Birżebbuġa)

Route 5

From Tal-Qroqq (L-Imsida) to Il-Mosta
University Roundabout, Tal-Qroqq – next to the University of Malta
Triq Dun Karm (Birkirkara Bypass), L-Imsida/Birkirkara – leading from Tal-Qroqq, Swatar, University of Malta and Mater Dei Hospital to Birkirkara, L-Iklin, Lija and Balzan 
Lija Roundabout – the main roundabout between Lija, Balzan, L-Iklin and Birkirkara 
Triq in-Naxxar (Naxxar Road, Lija/L-Iklin – leading from Birkirkara, Lija, Balzan and L-Iklin to In-Naxxar
Triq il-Mosta (Mosta Road), Lija/In-Naxxar – leading from Lija, L-Iklin and In-Naxxar to Mosta Techno Park 
Triq Valletta (Valletta Road), Il-Mosta – leading from Mosta Techno Park to Il-Mosta centre.

Route 6

From Blata l-Bajda (Il-Ħamrun) to Valletta
Triq Nazzjonali (National Road), Blata l-Bajda  – leading from Il-Ħamrun and Il-Marsa to Floriana, Malta 
Triq Sant' Anna (St. Anne's Street) – leading from Floriana, Malta to Valletta

Route 7

From Mrieħel (Ħal Qormi) to Għajn Qajjet (Ir-Rabat)
Triq is-Sebħ (Mrieħel Bypass), Ħal Qormi – leading from Marsa-Ħamrun Bypass and Santa Venera Tunnels to Ħal Qormi (St. George's Parish area)
Dawret l-Imrieħel (Mrieħel Bypass), Mrieħel – leading from Ħal Qormi to Birkirkara and Ħal Balzan 
Triq l-Imdina (Notabile Road), Ħal Balzan – leading from Mrieħel and Birkirkara to Ħal Balzan and Ħ'Attard (San Anton Palace area)
Triq il-Belt Valletta (Valletta Road), Ħ'Attard – leading from Ħal Balzan and San Anton Palace area to Ħ'Attard 
Triq in-Nutar Żarb (Notary Zarb Street), Ħ'Attard – leading from Ħ'Attard centre to Ħal Warda area
Triq iż-Żagħfran (Saffron Street), Ħ'Attard – leading from Ħal Warda area to Ta' Qali 
Triq l-Imdina (Mdina Road), Ħ'Attard – leading from Ħ'Attard to Ta' Qali, Mdina and Ir-Rabat 
Triq Buqana (Buqana Road), Ir-Rabat – leading from Ta' Qali and Ħaż-Żebbuġ to Mdina, L-Imtarfa and Il-Mosta 
Triq il-Kavallier Vincenzo Bonello (Chev. V. Bonello Street), L-Imtarfa  – leading from Buqana and Tal-Infetti areas to L-Imtarfa 
Triq il-Maltin Internati u Eżiljati (Mtarfa Bypass), L-Imtarfa – leading from L-Imtarfa to Ir-Rabat (Għajn Qajjet and Nigret areas)

Route 8

From Għajn Dwieli (Paola, Malta) to Il-Ħamrun 
Għajn Dwieli roundabout – crossroad between Paola, Malta, Il-Fgura, and Bormla 
Triq Kordin (Corradino Road) – leading from Għajn Dwieli and Corradino to Paola, Malta (Our Lady of Lourdes Parish Church)
Vjal Sir Paul Boffa (Sir Paul Boffa Avenue) – leading from Paola, Malta to Il-Marsa 
Triq Giuseppe Garibaldi (Garibaldi Avenue) – leading from Il-Marsa to Ħal Luqa and Santa Luċija 
Triq il-Kunsill tal-Ewropa (Council of Europe Street) – leading from Santa Luċija to Ħal Luqa and Malta International Airport
Triq San Tumas (St. Thomas Street), Ħal Luqa  – leading from Malta International Airport to Ħal Farruġ
Triq Ħal Qormi (Qormi Road), Ħal Farruġ  – leading from Ħal Farruġ and Ħal Luqa to Għammieri and Ħal Qormi
Triq Ħal Luqa (Luqa Road), Ħal Qormi – leading from Għammieri and Ħal Farruġ to Ħal Qormi
Tal-Imgħallaq Roundabout – crossroad between Ħal Qormi, Il-Marsa, Ħal Luqa and Ħaż-Żebbuġ 
Triq Manwel Dimech (Manoel Dimech Street), Ħal Qormi – leading from Ħal Qormi (St. Sebastian's Parish area) to Il-Marsa
Triq Ħal Qormi (Qormi Road), Il-Marsa – leading from Il-Marsa to Il-Ħamrun

Route 9

From Addolorata Cemetery (Paola, Malta) to Malta International Airport (Ħal Luqa)
Vjal Santa Luċija (St. Lucia Avenue), Paola, Malta  – leading from Il-Marsa and Paola, Malta to Santa Luċija and Ħal Tarxien 
Mintoff Roundabout – crossroad between Paola, Malta, Ħal Tarxien, Santa Luċija and Ħal Luqa 
Triq Tal-Barrani (Tal-Barrani Road), Ħal Tarxien – leading from Ħal Tarxien and Santa Luċija to Bulebel and Iż-Żejtun
Triq Tal-Barrani (Tal-Barrani Road), Iż-Żejtun – leading from Bulebel and Iż-Żejtun to Bir id-Deheb and Ħal Għaxaq
Dawret Ħal Għaxaq (Għaxaq Bypass), Ħal Għaxaq – leading from Bir id-Deheb to Il-Gudja
Triq Ħal Għaxaq (Għaxaq Road), Il-Gudja – leading from Ħal Għaxaq to Il-Gudja (Palazzo Bettina area)
Dawret il-Gudja (Gudja Bypass), Il-Gudja – leading from Il-Gudja to Malta International Airport and Ħal Luqa

Route 16

From Ħad-Dingli to Buġibba
Triq ir-Rabat (Rabat Road), Ħad-Dingli – leading from Ħad-Dingli to Buskett
Triq Ħad-Dingli (Dingli Road), Ir-Rabat – leading from Buskett to Ir-Rabat (Għar Barka area)
Triq Ħal Tartarni (Ħal Tartarni Road), Ir-Rabat – leading from Għar Barka area to St. Dominic area
Triq il-Kulleġġ (College Street), Ir-Rabat – leading from Tal-Virtù and St. Dominic area to Mdina and Ir-Rabat centre
Triq Nikola Saura (Saura Street), Ir-Rabat – leading from Ir-Rabat centre to Mdina
Telgħa tas-Saqqajja ( Saqqajja Hill), Mdina – leading from Ir-Rabat and Mdina to Ta' Qali, Ħ'Attard and Ħaż-Żebbuġ
Triq Tal-Infetti (Infetti Road), Mdina – leading from Mdina to Ta' Qali, Buqana and Chadwick Lake
Triq Buqana (Buqana Road), Ir-Rabat – leading from Mdina and L-Imtarfa to Il-Mosta and L-Imġarr
Triq Ta' Żejfa (Ta' Żejfa Road), Il-Mosta – leading from Ta' Qali and L-Imġarr to Ta' Żokkrija, Mount St. Joseph and Tarġa Gap areas in Il-Mosta
Triq il-Missjunarji Maltin (Maltese Missioners Street), Il-Mosta – leading from Ta' Żokkrija and Bistra areas to Tarġa Gap and Burmarrad
Vjal Millbrae (Millbrae Avenue), Il-Mosta – leading from Tarġa Gap and Il-Mosta to Bidnija and Burmarrad
Triq Burmarrad (Burmarrad Avenue), Burmarrad – leading from Bidnija and Burmarrad to Wardija, Buġibba and San Pawl il-Baħar
Triq Toni Camilleri (T. Camilleri Street), Burmarrad – next to Burmarrad Parish Church

Route 17

From L-Imġarr to Il-Mosta
Triq iż-Żebbiegħ (Żebbiegħ Road), L-Imġarr – leading from L-Imġarr to Żebbiegħ
Triq l-Imġarr (Mġarr Road), L-Imġarr – leading from Żebbiegħ to Il-Mosta and Ta' Qali
Triq San Pawl tal-Qliegħa, Il-Mosta – leading from Ta' Qali and Chadwick Lake to Il-Mosta (Blata l-Għolja area)
Triq il-Kbira (Main Street), Il-Mosta – leading from Blata l-Għolja and Ta' Mellu to Mosta Rotunda, Il-Mosta main square.

Route 18

From Kappara (San Ġwann) to Tarġa Gap (Il-Mosta)
Triq Birkirkara (B'Kara Road), San Ġwann – leading from San Ġiljan and Tas-Sliema to Kappara (San Ġwann)
Triq in-Naxxar (Naxxar Road), San Ġwann – leading from Kappara to San Ġwann centre
Vjal ir-Riħan (Riħan Avenue), San Ġwann – leading from San Ġwann to Ta' Żwejt and Ħal Għargħur 
Triq Tal-Balal (Tal-Balal Road), San Ġwann/Ħal Għargħur – leading from Ta' Żwejt and San Ġwann to Ħal Għargħur, Xwieki and In-Naxxar 
Triq il-Parroċċa (Parish Street), In-Naxxar – leading from Ħal Għargħur and L-Iklin to In-Naxxar centre
Vjal il-Ħaddiem (Labour Avenue), In-Naxxar – leading from In-Naxxar centre to Ħal Lija and Mosta Techno Park
Triq Valletta (Valletta Road), Il-Mosta – leading from Mosta Techno Park to Il-Mosta centre (Tad-Daqqaq and Sgħajtar areas)
Vjal l-Indipendenza (Independence Avenue), Il-Mosta – leading from Tad-Daqqaq and Sgħajtar areas to Blata l-Għolja and Ta' Mlit areas in Il-Mosta 
Triq il-Kbira (Main Street), Il-Mosta – leading from Blata l-Għolja to Il-Mosta centre
Triq il-Kostituzzjoni (Constitution Street), Il-Mosta – leading from Il-Mosta centre to Tarġa Gap and Ta' Żokkrija

Route 19

From Santa Venera to Birkirkara
Triq il-Ferrovija l-Qadima (Old Railway Track) – leading from Il-Ħamrun and L-Imsida to Birkirkara and Fleur de Lys, Malta
Triq Salvu Psaila (Psaila Street) – leading from Santa Venera to Birkirkara centre

Route 20

From San Anton Palace (Ħ'Attard) to Fleur de Lys, Malta
Triq Birbal (Birbal Street), Ħal Balzan – leading from Ħ'Attard to Birkirkara
Triq il-Wied (Valley Road), Birkirkara – leading from Ħal Balzan to Birkirkara centre, L-Imsida and Santa Venera
Triq Fleur de Lys (Fleur de Lys Road), Birkirkara – leading from Birkirkara Valley to Fleur de Lys, Malta, Santa Venera and Ħal Qormi (Mrieħel area)

Route 21

From Ħal Qormi (St. Sebastian's Parish area) to Ta' Qali
Triq Ġuże' Duca (Duca Road), Ħal Qormi – leading from St. Sebastian's Parish area to Ta' Paskarella and Ħandaq
Triq l-Imdina (Mdina), Ħal Qormi/Ħaż-Żebbuġ – leading from Il-Marsa and Ħal Qormi to Ta' Qali, Ħ'Attard, Ir-Rabat and Mdina

Route 22

From Tal-Qroqq (L-Imsida) to Blata l-Bajda
University Roundabout, L-Imsida  – crossroad between Birkirkara, Swatar, Il-Gżira, L-Imsida and San Ġwann
Triq Mikiel Anton Vassalli (M.A. Vassalli Street), L-Imsida – leading from University of Malta and Tal-Qroqq to L-Imsida centre
Pjazza 5 ta' Ottubru (Msida Strand), L-Imsida – the main square of L-Imsida, leading to Il-Gżira, Ta' Xbiex, Santa Venera and Birkirkara 
Misraħ Ġuże' Ellul Mercer (Ellul Mercer Square or Msida Marina), L-Imsida – leading from L-Imsida and Ta' Xbiex to Pieta, Malta and Birkirkara 
Triq il-Marina (Marina Street), Pieta, Malta – leading from L-Imsida to Floriana, Malta, Il-Ħamrun and Blata l-Bajda 
Triq l-Indipendenza (Independence Street), Blata l-Bajda – leading from Pieta, Malta and Sa Maison to Blata l-Bajda, Floriana, Malat and Valletta

Route 23
From Tal-Ħawli (Il-Birgu) to Fort St. Leonard (Ħaż-Żabbar)

Triq il-Kottonera (Cottonera Road), Tal-Ħawli, Il-Birgu – leading from Notre Dame Gate (Ħaż-Żabbar) to Bormla and Il-Birgu
Triq San Dwardu (St. Edward's Road), Fortini, Il-Birgu – leading from Il-Birgu and Bormla to Il-Kalkara
Triq Santa Liberata (Santa Liberata Road), Il-Kalkara – leading from Santa Liberata area (Il-Kalkara) to Smart City Malta, Fort Rinella and Fort Ricasoli
Triq Santu Rokku (St. Roque Road), Il-Kalkara – leading from Santa Liberata area (Il-Kalkara) to St. Peter's and Ix-Xgħajra
Triq San Leonardu (St. Leonard's Road), Ħaż-Żabbar – leading from St. Peter's to Ix-Xgħajra and Ħaż-Żabbar (Tal-Maġġi area)

Route 24
From Corradino (Paola, Malta to Bormla
Triq Għajn Dwieli (Għajn Dwieli Road), Paola, Malta – leading from Il-Fgura and Paola, Malta to Bormla
Triq it-Tlett Ibliet (Three Cities Road), Bormla – leading from Għajn Dwieli to Bormla (San Ġwann t'Għuxa area)
Triq San Franġisk (St. Frances Street), Bormla – leading from San Ġwann t'Għuxa to Bormla centre and Senglea
Fuq San Pawl (St. Paul's Street), Bormla – leading to Bormla main square
Misraħ Gavino Gulia (Gulia Square), Bormla – Bormla main square
Ix-Xatt ta' Bormla (Cospicua Waterfront), Bormla – leading from Bormla to Il-Birgu
Triq it-8 ta' Diċembru (8 December Road), Bormla – leading from Bormla and Il-Birgu to Il-Kalkara
Triq il-Kottonera (Cottonera Road), Il-Birgu – leading from Il-Birgu to Ħaż-Żabbar and Tal-Ħawli
Triq San Nikola (St. Nicholas Road), Bormla – leading from Tal-Ħawli (Il-Birgu) to Verdala (Bormla) and Il-Fgura
Triq San Ġwann t'Għuxa (San Ġwann t'Għuxa Road), Bormla – leading from Verdala to Għajn Dwieli, Paola, Malta and Senglea

Route 25

From Ħaż-Żebbuġ to Ħ'Attard
Triq Ħ'Attard (Attard Road), Ħaż-Żebbuġ – leading from Ħal Muxi area (Ħaż-Żebbuġ) to Ħ'Attard
Triq Ħaż-Żebbuġ (Żebbuġ Road), Ħ'Attard – leading from Ħal Warda area (Ħ'Attard) to Ħaż-Żebbuġ

Route 26

From Bulebel to Marsaskala
Triq San Anard (St. Leonard's Road), Ħal Tarxien – leading from Ħal Għaxaq and Il-Gudja to Bulebel Industrial Estate and Il-Fgura
Triq id-Dejma (Dejma Road), Il-Fgura – leading from Ħal Tarxien to Ħaż-Żabbar (Buleben iż-Żgħir area) and Iż-Żejtun
Triq l-10 ta' Settembru, 1797 (Taċ-Ċawsli), Ħaż-Żabbar – leading from Bulebel to Il-Fgura and Ħaż-Żabbar (Hompesch Arch)
Triq il-Mina ta' Hompesch (Hompesch Arch Street), Ħaż-Żabbar – leading from Il-Fgura to Ħaż-Żabbar centre
Triq Villabate (M'Skala Bypass), Ħaż-Żabbar – leading from Ħaż-Żabbar to Marsaskala
Triq Sant' Antnin (M'Skala Bypass), Marsaskala – leading from Sant' Antnin Family Park to Marsaskala Bay

Route 27

From Ħaż-Żebbuġ to Is-Siġġiewi
Triq is-Siġġiewi (Siġġiewi Road), Ħaż-Żebbuġ/Is-Siġġiewi – leading from Ħaż-Żebbuġ (Rohan Arch) to Is-Siġġiewi (Siġġiewi Bypass)

Route 28

From Malta International Airport (Ħal Luqa) to Il-Qrendi
Il-Mina ta' Ħal Kirkop (Kirkop Tunnels), Ħal Luqa/Ħal Kirkop – leading from Ħal Luqa and Il-Gudja to Ħal Kirkop
Triq l-Industrija (Industry Street), Ħal Kirkop – leading from Ħal Kirkop to Iż-Żurrieq and L-Imqabba
Triq l-Imqabba (Mqabba Road), L-Imqabba – the main road to L-Imqabba from Ħal Kirkop
Triq il-Konvoj ta' Santa Marija (Mqabba Bypass), L-Imqabba – leading from L-Imqabba centre to Il-Qrendi
Triq il-Qrendi (Qrendi Road), L-Imqabba – the main road to Il-Qrendi from L-Imqabba

Route 29

From Bir id-Deheb (Iż-Żejtun) to Qajjenza (Birżebbuġa)
Triq Għar Dalam (Għar Dalam Road), Ħal Għaxaq/Birżebbuġa – leading from Iż-Żejtun, Ħal Għaxaq and Marsaxlokk to Birżebbuġa

Route 30

From Bir id-Deheb (Iż-Żejtun) to Delimara (Marsaxlokk)
Triq Marsaxlokk (M'Xlokk Road), Marsaxlokk- leading from Iż-Żejtun and Ħal Għaxaq to Marsaxlokk (Marnisi area)
Triq iż-Żejtun (Żejtun Road), Marsaxlokk – leading from Marnisi area to Marsaxlokk centre
Triq Melqart (Melqart Street), Marsaxlokk – leading to Ħal Ġinwi and Tas-Silġ areas
Triq Axtart (Astarte Street), Marsaxlokk – leading to Ħal Ġinwi area
Triq Bir Rikka (Bir Rikka Road), Marsaxlokk – leading from Marsaxlokk centre to Tas-Silġ and Delimara
Triq il-Power Station (Power Station Road), Marsaxlokk – leading from Tas-Silġ to Delimara Power Station

Route 31

From Ħal Kirkop to Iż-Żurrieq
Triq il-Belt Valletta (Valletta Road), Iż-Żurrieq – leading from Ħal Kirkop and L-Imqabba to Iż-Żurrieq, Ħal Safi, Bubaqra and Blue Grotto

Route 32

From Ħal Kirkop to Ħal Safi
Triq Dun Ġwann Barbara, Ħal Kirkop – leading from Valletta Road (Iż-Żurrieq) to Ħal Kirkop centre
Triq San Ġwann (St. John's Street), Ħal Kirkop/Ħal Safi – leading from Ħal Kirkop (St. Benedict's area) to Ħal Safi centre

Route 33

From Ħal Safi to Malta International Airport
Triq Tal-Aħwar (Tal-Aħwar Road), Ħal Safi – leading from Ħal Safi to Ħal Kirkop 
Triq iż-Żurrieq (Żurrieq Road), Ħal Safi – leading from Ħal Safi outskirts to Medavia (Safi Apron)
Triq Carmelo Caruana (C. Caruana Street), Ħal Kirkop – leading from Ħal Kirkop to Malta International Airport
Triq l-Industrija (Industry Street), Ħal Kirkop – leading to Malta International Airport, Ħal Luqa, Il-Gudja and L-Imqabba

Route 34

From Grand Harbour (Paola, Malta) to Notre Dame Gate (Ħaż-Żabbar)
Telgħa ta' Ras Ħanżir (Ras Ħanżir Hill), Corradino, Paola, Malta – leading from Corradino Industrial Estate to Għajn Dwieli
Triq l-Isqof Buhagiar (Bishop Buhagiar Street), Paola, Malta – leading from Għajn Dwieli to Paola, Malta
Vjal it-28 ta' April (28 April Avenue), Paola, Malta – leading from Paola, Malta to Il-Fgura
Triq Ħaż-Żabbar (Żabbar Road), Il-Fgura – leading from Il-Fgura (Tal-Liedna area) to Bormla, Senglea and Ħal Tarxien
Triq Hompesch (Hompesch Road), Il-Fgura – leading from Il-Fgura (Tal-Gallu area) to Ħaż-Żabbar and Iż-Żejtun
Triq il-Mina ta' Hompesch (Hompesch Arch Street), Ħaż-Żabbar – leading from Bulebel to Ħaż-Żabbar centre and Marsaskala
Triq Tal-Labour (Labour Road), Ħaż-Żabbar – leading from Ħaż-Żabbar to Il-Birgu and Il-Kalkara

Route 114

From Qammieħ (Ċirkewwa) to Aħrax (Marfa) in Il-Mellieħa
Triq Tad-Dahar (Tad-Dahar Road), Ċirkewwa – leading from Qammieħ to Red Tower (It-Torri l-Aħmar)
Triq l-Aħrax (Aħrax Road), Marfa, Il-Mellieħa – leading from Red Tower to Aħrax Point. 
Triq Ramlet (Armier Road), Marfa, Il-Mellieħa – leading from Aħrax to Armier Bay
Triq Daħlet ix-Xmajjar (Daħlet ix-Xmajjar Road), Il-Mellieħa – leading from Aħrax Point to Armier Redoubt (Ramla tat-Torri)

Route 115

From Għadira Beach (Il-Mellieħa) to Manikata
Triq Tal-Prajjet (Anchor Bay Road), Il-Mellieħa – leading from Għadira Beach (Mellieħa Bay) to Popeye Village (Anchor Bay)
Road in Majjistral Park, Il-Mellieħa – leading from Għajn Żnuber Tower and Manikata to Popeye Village (Anchor Bay)

Route 116

From Pwales (Xemxija, San Pawl il-Baħar) to Selmun Palace (Il-Mellieħa)
Triq Għajn Tuffieħa (Għajn Tuffieħa Road), Xemxija – leading from Pwales, Xemxija and San Pawl il-Baħar to Mbordin and Għajn Tuffieħa
Triq il-Miżieb (Miżieb Road), Il-Mellieħa – leading from Mbordin and Miżieb to Il-Mellieħa
Triq Louis Wettinger (L. Wettinger Street), Il-Mellieħa – leading from Ta' Pennellu to Il-Mellieħa centre. 
Triq Selmun (Selmun Road), Il-Mellieħa – leading from Il-Mellieħa centre to Selmun Palace

Route 117

From Ta' Pennellu (Il-Mellieħa) to Ħal Far (Birżebbuġa)
Triq il-Mellieħa (Mellieħa Road), Manikata – leading from Il-Mellieħa (Ta' Pennellu area) to Manikata
Triq il-Mejjiesa (Mejjiesa Road), Manikata – leading from Manikata to Għajn Tuffieħa
Triq il-Knisja l-Qadima (Old Church Street), Manikata – leading from Manikata centre to Għajn Tuffieħa
Triq il-Manikata (Manikata Road), Manikata – leading from Manikata to Golden Bay
Triq Tal-Wilġa (Wilġa Road), Għajn Tuffieħa – leading from Golden Bay to Għajn Tuffieħa Tower (Riviera Bay)
Triq Għajn Tuffieħa (Golden Bay Road), L-Imġarr – leading from Għajn Tuffieħa to Għajn Tuffieħa Roman Baths and Ta' Mrejnu
Triq il-Banjijiet Rumani (Roman Baths Road), L-Imġarr – leading from Ta' Mrejnu to L-Imġarr
Triq Binġemma (Binġemma Road), L-Imġarr – leading from L-Imġarr and Żebbiegħ to Fort Binġemma
Triq Tas-Salib (Tas-Salib Road), Ir-Rabat – leading from Fort Binġemma to Fiddien
Triq Għajn Qajjet (Għajn Qajjet Road), Ir-Rabat – leading from Fiddien to Ir-Rabat (Nigret area)
Vjal il-Ħaddiem (Labour Avenue), Ir-Rabat – leading from Nigret to Għar Barka in Ir-Rabat
Triq Ħal Tartarni (Ħal Tartarni Road), Ir-Rabat – leading from Għar Barka and Ħad-Dingli to Ir-Rabat (St. Domenic's area)
Triq il-Buskett (Buskett Road), Ir-Rabat – leading from Ir-Rabat to Buskett
Trejqet Inżul ix-Xemx (Sunset Path), Ħad-Dingli – leading from Buskett to Dingli Cliffs
Triq Panoramika (Panoramic Street), Ħad-Dingli – leading from Dingli Cliffs to Girgenti Palace and Ġebel Ciantar
Triq Blat il-Qamar (Moon Rocks Street), Is-Siġġiewi – leading from Girgenti Palace to Is-Siġġiewi
Triq Ta' Bur il-Kbir (Bur il-Kbir Road), Is-Siġġiewi – leading from Is-Siġġiewi (Wies Ħesri area) to Fawwara
Triq Tal-Providenza (Tal-Providenza Road), Is-Siġġiewi – leading from Is-Siġġiewi and Fawwara to Tal-Providenza
Triq Lapsi (Għar Lapsi Road), Is-Siġġiewi – leading from Tal-Providenza to Għar Lapsi
Triq Wied iż-Żurrieq, Is-Siġġiewi/Il-Qrendi – leading from Għar Lapsi to Ħaġar Qim
Triq Panorama (Panorama Street), Il-Qrendi – leading from Ħaġar Qim to Blue Grotto (Malta) and Wied iż-Żurriq Tower
Triq il-Wied (Valley Road), Iż-Żurrieq – leading from Blue Grotto (Malta) to Iż-Żurrieq (Nigret area)
Vjal il-Blue Grotto (Blue Grotto Avenue), Iż-Żurrieq – leading from Nigret area to Iż-Żurrieq centre
Vjal ix-Xarolla (Xarolla Avenue), Iż-Żurrieq – leading from Iż-Żurrieq to Ħal Safi, Bubaqra and Xarolla Windmill
Triq Sant' Andrija (St. Andrew's Street), Bubaqra – leading from Xarolla Windmill to Ħal Far
Triq Ħal Far (Ħal Far Road), Bubaqra – leading from Iż-Żurrieq and Bubaqra to Ħal Far

Route 118

From Madliena (Is-Swieqi) to Għajn Tuffieħa
Telgħa tal-Madliena (Madliena Hill), Is-Swieqi – leading from Madliena to Victoria Lines, Ħal Għargħur
Triq il-Madliena (Madliena Road), Ħal Għargħur – leading from Victoria Lines to Ħal Għargħur. 
Triq Caravaggio (Caravaggio Street), Ħal Għargħur – leading to Ħal Għargħur centre 
Triq il-31 ta' Marzu (31 March Street), Ħal Għargħur – Ħal Għargħur centre 
Triq San Bartilmew (St. Bartolomeo Street), Ħal Għargħur – leading from Ħal Għargħur centre to In-Naxxar
Triq San Ġwann (St. John's Street), Ħal Għargħur – leading from Ħal Għargħur to In-Naxxar
Triq M. Murray (Murray Street), In-Naxxar – leading from In-Naxxar and L-Iklin to Birguma
Triq San Pawl (St. Paul's Street), In-Naxxar – leading from In-Naxxar to San Pawl tat-Tarġa
Triq Andrea Debono (Andrea Debono Street), In-Naxxar – leading from San Pawl tat-Tarġa to Birguma
Triq Jean Houel (Houel Street), In-Naxxar – leading from Birguma to Magħtab
Telgħa T'Alla u Ommu (T'Alla u Ommu Hill), In-Naxxar – leading from In-Naxxar to Salina and Qawra
Triq Burmarrad (Burmarrad Road), In-Naxxar – leading from Magħtab to Burmarrad
Triq Burmarrad (Burmarrad Road), Burmarrad – leading from Burmarrad to Wardija, Buġibba and San Pawl il-Baħar
Triq il-Wardija (Wardija Road), Burmarrad – leading from Burmarrad to Wardija Ridge
Triq Busewdien (Busewdien Road), Wardija – leading from Wardija to Żebbiegħ and L-Imġarr
Triq San Martin (San Martin Road), San Martin, San Pawl il-Baħar – leading from L-Imġarr to Xemxija

Route 119

From Birguma (In-Naxxar) to Santa Margarita (Il-Mosta)
Triq il-Fortizza tal-Mosta (Fort Mosta Road), In-Naxxar/Il-Mosta – leading from Birguma (In-Naxxar) to Fort Mosta and Santa Margarita
Vjal il-Qalbiena Mosta (Mosta Heroes Avenue), Il-Mosta – leading from Santa Margarita to Sgħajtar (Il-Mosta)

Route 120

From Kennedy Grove (Qawra) to San Pawl tat-Tarġa (In-Naxxar)
Triq is-Salina (Salina Road) (known also as Telgħa t'Alla u Ommu (T'Alla u Ommu Hill)), In-Naxxar – leading from Kennedy Grove and Salina to In-Naxxar and Magħtab

Route 121

From Qalet Marku (Baħar iċ-Ċagħaq) to Magħtab
Triq ir-Ramla (Ramla Road), In-Naxxar – leading from Coast Road (Baħar iċ-Ċagħaq) to Magħtab centre
Triq il-Kappella ta' Santa Marija (St. Mary's Chapel Street), In-Naxxar – leading from Magħtab centre to In-Naxxar (T'Alla u Ommu Hill)
Triq l-Arżnu (Arżnu Street), In-Naxxar – side street leads to T'Alla u Ommu Hill

Route 122

From Tarġa Gap (Il-Mosta) to Żebbiegħ(L-Imġarr)
Triq il-Bidnija (Bidnija Road), Il-Mosta – leading from Tarġa Gap, Il-Mosta to Bidnija centre
Triq il-Bidnija (Bidnija Road), Bidnija/L-Imġarr – leading from Bidnija centre to Żebbiegħ and L-Imġarr
Triq Sir Temi Żammit (Sir T. Zammit Road), L-Imġarr – leading from Żebbiegħ to L-Imġarr (Ta' Mrejnu area) and Għajn Tuffieħa

Route 123

From Żebbiegħ (L-Imġarr) to Ġnejna Bay
Triq Fisher (Fisher Street), L-Imġarr – leading from Żebbiegħ to L-Imġarr centre.
Triq il-Kurat Chetcuti (Chetcuti Street), L-Imġarr – passes from L-Imġarr centre. 
Wesgħa tal-Ġublew (Jubilee Square), L-Imġarr – L-Imġarr main square 
Triq il-Kbira (Main Street), L-Imġarr – leading from L-Imġarr centre to Lippija Tower and Santi
Triq il-Ġnejna (Ġnejna Road), L-Imġarr – leading from L-Imġarr (Zammitello Palace area) to Ġnejna Bay

Route 124

From Fiddien (Ir-Rabat) to Lippija Tower (L-Imġarr)
Il-Pont tal-Fiddien (Fiddien Bridge), Ir-Rabat – leading from Fiddien to Bieb ir-Ruwa
Bieb ir-Ruwa, Ir-Rabat – leading from Bieb ir-Ruwa and Ir-Rabat to Baħrija, Kunċizzjoni and Għermieri
Triq is-Santi (Santi Road), Ir-Rabat/L-Imġarr – leading from Baħrija and Ir-Rabat to Santi and L-Imġarr

Route 125

From Bieb ir-Ruwa (Ir-Rabat) to Baħrija
Triq is-Sajf ta' San Marin (St. Martin's Summer Street), Baħrija – leading from Ir-Rabat, Bieb ir-Ruwa and Kunċizzjoni to Baħrija

Route 126

From Fiddien (Ir-Rabat) to Mtaħleb
Il-Pont tal-Fiddien (Fiddien Bridge), Ir-Rabat – leading from Ir-Rabat to Mtaħleb and Baħrija
Triq l-Imtaħleb (Mtaħleb Road), Ir-Rabat – leading from Fiddien to Mtaħleb and Miġra l-Ferħa

Route 127

From Paceville to L-Imsida
Triq Gort (Gort Street), San Ġiljan – leading from Is-Swieqi to Paceville
Triq San Ġorġ (St. George's Road), San Ġiljan – leading from Paceville to San Ġiljan (Spinola area) and Portomaso
Ix-Xatt ta' Spinola (Spinola Square), San Ġiljan – San Ġiljan centre
Triq Ġorġ Borġ Olivier (George Borg Olivier Street), San Ġiljan – leading from San Ġiljan to Balluta Bay
Triq il-Kbira (Main Street), San Ġiljan – leading from Balluta Bay to Tas-Sliema (Exiles area)
Triq it-Torri (Tower Road), Tas-Sliema – leading from Exiles to Tas-Sliema (Għar id-Dud area)
Ix-Xatt (The Strand), Tas-Sliema – leading from Tas-Sliema (Ferries area) to Il-Gżira and Manoel Island
Triq ix-Xatt (Gżira Strand), Il-Gżira – leading from Il-Gżira to Ta' Xbiex
Ix-Xatt ta' Ta' Xbiex (Ta' Xbiex Strand), Ta' Xbiex – leading from Il-Gżira to L-Imsida
Triq Abate Rigord (Abate Rigord Street), Ta' Xbiex – leading from Ta' Xbiex to L-Imsida

Route 128

From L-Imsida to Kappara (San Ġwann)
Triq d'Argens (Rue d'Argens), L-Imsida/Il-Gżira – leading from L-Imsida to Il-Gżira (Savoy area), Ta' Xbiex and Tas-Sliema
Triq il-Prinċipessa Margarita (Princess Margareth Street), L-Imsida/Ta' Xbiex – leading from L-Imsida (Rue d'Argens) to Ta' Xbiex centre
Triq l-Imrabat (Mrabat Road), Tas-Sliema – leading from Il-Gżira to Balluta Bay and San Ġiljan
It-Telgħa ta' Birkirkara (B'Kara Hill), San Ġiljan – leading from Balluta Bay and Tas-Sliema to Kappara and San Ġwann

Route 129

From Kappara (San Ġwann) to Misraħ Lewża
Triq Tas-Sliema (Sliema Road or Kappara Hill), San Ġwann – leading from Kappara and Il-Gżira to San Ġwann centre
Triq Bellavista (Bellavista Road), San Ġwann – leading from San Ġwann centre to Misraħ Lewża and Ta' Żwejt areas in San Ġwann

From 130

From Blata l-Bajda to San Anton Palace (Ħ'Attard)
Triq Nazzjonali (National Road), Blata l-Bajda – leading from Floriana, Malta to Il-Ħamrun and Il-Marsa
Triq il-Kbira San Ġużepp (St. Joseph High Street), Il-Ħamrun – leading from Blata l-Bajda to Il-Ħamrun, Gwardamanġa and Santa Venera
Triq il-Kbira San Ġużepp (St. Joseph High Street), Santa Venera – leading from Il-Ħamrun to Birkirkara, Fleur-de-Lys, Malta, Mrieħel and Ħal Qormi
Triq l-Imdina (Notabile Road), Birkirkara – leading from Fleur-de-Lys, Malta to Ħ'Attard and Ħal Balzan 
Triq l-Imdina (Mdina Road), Ħal Balzan/Ħ'Attard – leading from Birkirkara and Mrieħel to San Anton Palace and Ħ'Attard centre
Vjal de Paule (De Paule Avenue), Ħal Balzan/Ħ'Attard – leads to San Anton Palace main entrance and Ħal Balzan centre.

Route 131

From Nigret (Ir-Rabat) to Dingli Cliffs (Ħad-Dingli)
Triq Santa Katarina (Santa Katarina Road), Ir-Rabat – leading from Ir-Rabat (Nigret area) to Santa Katarina and Raba' Nemel 
Triq Misraħ Suffara (Misraħ Suffara Road), Ħad-Dingli – leading from Raba' Nemel and Ħofret ir-Ritz to Ħad-Dingli 
Triq San Pawl tal-Pitkali (San Pawl tal-Pitakli Road), Ħad-Dingli – leading from Ħad-Dingli centre to Dingli Cliffs and Simblija 
Triq Panoramika (Panoramic Street), Ħad-Dingli – leading from Dingli Cliffs to Girgenti and Is-Siġġiewi

Route 132

From Tal-Virtù (Ir-Rabat) to Albert Town (Il-Marsa)
Triq Tal-Virtù (Tal-Virtù Road), Ir-Rabat – leading from Ir-Rabat to Tal-Virtù and Ħaż-Żebbuġ (Gianpula area)
Triq it-Tiġrija (Racecourse Street), Is-Siġġiewi – leading from Ir-Rabat to Girgenti and Is-Siġġiewi 
Triq Blat il-Qamar (Moon Rocks Street), Is-Siġġiewi – leading from Girgenti to Is-Siġġiewi (Ta' Ħesri area)
Triq it-Tabib Nikol Żammit (Dr. N. Zammit Street), Is-Siġġiewi – leading from Ta' Ħesri to Is-Siġġiewi centre
Triq Santa Margarita (St. Margarita Street), Is-Siġġiewi – leads to Siġġiewi Bypass
Triq Mons. Mikiel Azzopardi (Siġġiewi Bypass), Is-Siġġiewi – leading from Ħaż-Żebbuġ to Is-Siġġiewi 
Triq l-Imqabba (Mqabba Road), Is-Siġġiewi – leading from Is-Siġġiewi to L-Imqabba and Ta' Kandja 
Triq Tas-Sejba (Sejba Road), L-Imqabba – leading from Ta' Kandja to L-Imqabba centre
Triq Ta' Ħal Farruġ (Ħal Farruġ Road), Is-Siġġiewi/Ħal Luqa – leading from Is-Siġġiewi and L-Imqabba to Ħal Farruġ
Triq l-Ingiered (Ingiered Road), Ħal Luqa – leading from Ħal Farruġ to St. Vincent de Paul Residence and Ħal Qormi
Triq l-Għammieri (Marsa Old Racing Track), Il-Marsa – leading from Ħal Qormi to Albert Town, Malta

Route 133

From Mdina to Gianpula (Ħaż-Żebbuġ)
Triq it-Tiġrija (Racecourse Street), Ir-Rabat – leading from Mdina and Saqqajja (Ir-Rabat) to Gianpula and Is-Siġġiewi
Triq Gianpula (Gianpula Street), Ħaż-Żebbuġ – leading from Ir-Rabat to Gianpula area and Ħaż-Żebbuġ

Route 134

From Bulebel (Iż-Żejtun) to Żonqor Tower (Marsaskala)
Triq Bormla (Cospicua Road) or Taċ-Ċawsli, Iż-Żejtun – leading from Il-Fgura and Bulebel to Iż-Żejtun (Ġebel San Martin area)
Triq Alfredo Cachia Żammit (A. Cachia Zammit Street), Iż-Żejtun – leading from Ġebel San Martin to Iż-Żejtun centre
Vjal il-25 ta' Novembru (25 November Avenue), Iż-Żejtun – leading from Iż-Żejtun to Tal-Barrani
Triq Tal-Barrani (Tal-Barrani Road), Iż-Żejtun – leading from Ħal Tarxien and Santa Luċija to Ħal Għaxaq and Bir id-Deheb
Triq il-President Anton Buttiġieġ (President A. Buttigieg Street), Iż-Żejtun – leading from Ħal Għaxaq and Bir id-Deheb to Ta' San Girgor (Iż-Żejtun)
Triq Dun Lawrenz Degabriele (Degabriele Street), Iż-Żejtun – next to Żejtun Roman Villa
Triq id-Daħla ta' San Tumas (St. Thomas Bay Road), Iż-Żejtun/Marsaskala – leading from Iż-Żejtun (Ta' San Girgor and Ħal Tmin) to Marsaskala (St. Thomas Bay area)
Triq Tal-Gardiel (Tal-Gardiel Road), Marsaskala – next to St. Thomas Bay
Triq il-Qaliet (Qaliet Street), Marsaskala – leading from St. Thomas Bay to Marsaskala 
Triq Sant' Antnin (St. Anthony's Road), Marsaskala – leading from Marsaskala Bay to Bellavista and Ħaż-Żabbar
Triq Sant' Anna (St. Anne's Street), Marsaskala – leads to Marsaskala centre
Triq ix-Xatt (Marina Street), Marsaskala – leading from Marsaskala centre to Marsaskala Bay
Triq iż-Żonqor (Żonqor Road), Marsaskala – leading from Marsaskala centre to Żonqor Tower 
Dawret il-Kunsill tal-Ewropa (Council of Europe Square), Marsaskala – the proposed site of the American University of Malta

Route 135

From Tal-Ħawli (Il-Birgu) to Ix-Xgħajra
Triq San Dwardu (St. Edwards' Road), Il-Birgu – leading from Il-Birgu to Tal-Ħawli and Il-Kalkara 
Triq Santa Duminka (St. Domenica Street), Ħaż-Żabbar – leading from Tal-Ħawli and Bormla to Ħaż-Żabbar 
Triq Tal-Labour (Labour Road), Ħaż-Żabbar – leading from Cottonera to Ħaż-Żabbar centre and Il-Fgura 
Misraħ il-Madonna Medjatriċi (Matrix Place), Ħaż-Żabbar  – the main square of Ħaż-Żabbar centre 
Triq Hompesch (Hompesch Road), Ħaż-Żabbar – leading to Żabbar Primary School
Triq il-Kunvent (Convent Street), Ħaż-Żabbar – leading from Ħaż-Żabbar centre to St Peter's 
Triq is-Santwarju (Sanctuary Street), Ħaż-Żabbar – leading from St Peter's and Ix-Xgħajra to Żabbar Sanctuary Museum 
Triq ix-Xgħajra (Xgħajra Road), Ħaż-Żabbar – leading from Ħaż-Żabbar and St Peter's to Ix-Xgħajra

Route 137

From Iż-Żejtun to Delimara
Triq ir-Ramla (Ramla Road), Iż-Żejtun – leading from Iż-Żejtun to Ħal Tmin 
part of Triq id-Daħla ta' San Tumas (St. Thomas Bay Road), Iż-Żejtun – leading from Marsaskala to Misraħ Strejnu (Iż-Żejtun)
Triq Strejnu (Strejnu Road), Iż-Żejtun – leading from Ħal Tmin and Marsaxlokk to Iż-Żejtun (San Niklaw area) 
Triq Xrobb l-Għaġin (Xrobb l-Għaġin Road), Iż-Żejtun – leading from Iż-Żejtun to Xrobb l-Għaġin Tower, Tas-Silġ and Marsaxlokk 
Triq Delimara (Delimara Road), Marsaxlokk – leading from Tas-Silġ to Delimara (Delimara Lighthouse) and St. Peter's Pool

Route 138

From Marsaxlokk to Għar Dalam (Birżebbuġa)
Triq Axtart (Astarte Street), Marsaxlokk
Triq Melqart (Melqart Street), Marsaxlokk 
Triq Bir Rikka (Bir Rikka Road), Marsaxlokk
Triq il-Power Station (Power Station Road), Marsaxlokk
Triq il-Wilġa (Wilġa Road), Marsaxlokk
Xatt is-Sajjieda (Fishermen's Strand), Marsaxlokk
Triq Tat-Trunċiera (Trunċiera Road), Marsaxlokk
Triq il-Qajjenza (Qajjenza Road), Birżebbuġa
Triq F.M. Ferretti (F.M. Ferretti Street), Birżebbuġa

Route 139

From Is-Siġġiewi to Ħaġar Qim (Il-Qrendi)
Triq Ta' Kilpa (Ta' Kilpa Road), Is-Siġġiewi – leading from Is-Siġġiewi to Ħal Xluq and Il-Qrendi
Triq Maddorbu (Maddorbu Road), Il-Qrendi – leading from Ħal Xluq to Il-Qrendi
Triq is-Siġġiewi (Siġġiewi Road), Il-Qrendi – leading from Misraħ is-Sinjura area to il-Qrendi centre
Triq l-Imqabba (Mqabba Road), Il-Qrendi – leading from Il-Qrendi to L-Imqabba
Triq it-Tempesta (Tempest Street), Il-Qrendi- leading from L-Imqabba and Il-Qrendi to Maqluba
Misraħ tal-Maqluba (Maqluba Square), Il-Qrendi – the main square of Maqluba
Triq Ħaġar Qim (Ħaġar Qim Road), Il-Qrendi – leading from Maqluba and Il-Qrendi to Ħaġar Qim and Mnajdra

Route 140

From Tal-Providenza (Is-Siġġiewi) to Għar Lapsi
Triq Għar Lapsi (Għar Lapsi Road), Is-Siġġiewi – leading from Is-Siġġiewi (Tal-Providenza area) to Għar Lapsi and Xaqqa Valley

Route 141

From Ħal Far to Birżebbuġa
Triq Tal-Ġebel (Tal-Ġebel Road), Birżebbuġa – leading from Ħal Far to Birżebbuġa (Parish Church area)

Route 142

From Bengħisa Battery to Għar Ħasan
Triq Tal-Karmnu (Our Lady of Carmelo Street), Birżebbuġa – leading from Birżebbuġa (Tal-Papa area) to Bengħisa Battery and Għar Ħasan
Triq Għar Ħasan (Għar Ħasan Road), Birżebbuġa – leading from Għar Ħasan to Ħal Far

Route 143

From Malta Freeport to Kalafrana
Triq Kalafrana (Calafrana Road), Birżebbuġa – leading from Malta Freeport and Birżebbuġa to Kalafrana (Oil Tanking facilities)

Route 144

From Qajjenza (Birżebbuġa) to Malta Freeport
Triq Birżebbuġa (B'Bugia Road), Birżebbuġa – leading from Qajjenza and Għar Dalam to Birżebbuġa centre 
Triq San Ġorġ (St. George's Bay), Birżebbuġa – the main road of St George's Bay (Il-Bajja ta' San Ġorġ)
Dawret il-Qalb Imqaddsa (Sacred Heart Promenade), Birżebbuġa – leading from St George's Bay to Pretty Bay
Triq il-Bajja s-Sabiħa (Pretty Bay), Birżebbuġa – leading from Birżebbuġa centre to Tal-Papa area
Misraħ is-Summit (Summit Square), Birżebbuġa – the main bus terminus of Birżebbuġa
Triq San Patrizju (St. Patrick's Street), Birżebbuġa – leading from Birżebbuġa (Pretty Bay) to Malta Freeport and Ħal Far

Route Network in Gozo

Route 1

From Mġarr, Gozo (Għajnsielem) to Dwejra (San Lawrenz)
Triq ix-Xatt (Gozo Ferry), Mġarr, Gozo
Triq l-Imġarr (Mġarr Road), Għajnsielem
Triq l-Imġarr (Mġarr Road), Ix-Xewkija
Triq Fortunato Mizzi (F. Mizzi Street), Victoria, Gozo
Triq ir-Repubblika (Republic Street), Victoria, Gozo
Pjazza Indipendenza (Independence Square) or it-Tokk, Victoria, Gozo
Triq Sant' Orsla (St. Ursula Street), Victoria, Gozo
Triq il-Papa Ġwanni Pawlu II (Pope John Paul II Street), Victoria, Gozo
Triq l-Għarb (Għarb Road), L-Għarb
Triq Franġisk Portelli (F. Portelli Street), L-Għarb
Triq San Lawrenz (St. Lawrence Road), San Lawrenz
Pjazza San Lawrenz (St. Lawrence Square), San Lawrenz
Triq id-Duluri (Our Lady of Sorrows Street), San Lawrenz
Triq Ta' Ċangura (Ciangura Road), San Lawrenz
Triq il-Ġebla tal-Ġeneral (Fungus Rock Road), San Lawrenz

Route 2

From Mġarr, Gozo (Għajnsielem) to Victoria, Gozo
Triq Sant' Antnin (St. Anthony's Road), Mġarr, Gozo
Triq l-Imġarr (Mġarr Road), In-Nadur
Triq Xandriku (Xandriku Street), In-Nadur
Triq il-Knisja (Church Street), In-Nadur
Triq it-Tiġrija (Racecourse Street), In-Nadur
Triq ir-Rabat (Victoria Road), In-Nadur
Triq Ta' Xħajma (Ta' Xħajma Road), In-Nadur/Ix-Xewkija
Triq Ta' Ħamet (Ta' Ħamet Road), Ix-Xagħra/Ix-Xewkija
Triq San Leonardu (St. Leonard Road), Ix-Xewkija
Triq Ta' Viani (Viani Road), Victoria, Gozo
Triq l-Ewropa (Europe Street), Victoria, Gozo
Triq Sir Luigi Camilleri (Sir L. Camilleri Street), Victoria, Gozo 
Triq Ta' Wara s-Sur (Behind the Bastions Street), Victoria, Gozo
Triq l-Imgħallem (Foreman Street), Victoria, Gozo

Route 3

From Victoria, Gozo to Marsalforn (Żebbuġ, Gozo)
Triq il-Kapuċċini (Capuchin Street), Victoria, Gozo
Triq Marsalforn (M'Forn Road), Victoria, Gozo
Triq ir-Rabat (Victoria Road), Marsalforn
Triq Lapsi (Lapsi Street), Marsalforn
Triq il-Wied (Valley Road), Marsalforn

Route 4

From Ix-Xewkija to Ix-Xagħra
Triq ix-Xagħra (Xagħra Road), Ix-Xewkija – leading from Ix-Xewkija (Għajn Lukin) to Ta' Ħamet 
Triq Ta' Ħamet (Ta' Ħamet Road), Ix-Xagħra – leading from Ix-Xewkija and Ta' Ħamet to Ġgantija
Vjal it-8 ta' Settembru (8 September Avenue), Ix-Xagħra – leading from Ġgantija to Ix-Xagħra centre

Route 10

From Victoria, Gozo to Ix-Xlendi (Il-Munxar)
Triq Gedrin (Gedrin Street), Victoria, Gozo – leading from L-Għarb and L-Għasri to Victoria, Gozo centre 
Triq id-Dawwara (Dawwara Street), Victoria, Gozo – leading from Ta' Kerċem to Victoria, Gozo centre
Triq Vajrinġa (Vajrinġa Street), Victoria, Gozo – leading from Victoria, Gozo centre to Fontana, Gozo 
Pjazza San Franġisk (St. Frances Square), Victoria, Gozo – Victoria, Gozo centre main square
Triq l-Arċisqof Pietru Pace (Archbishop Pietro Pace Street), Victoria, Gozo – leading from Victoria, Gozo centre to Gozo General Hospital and Cittadella (Gozo)
Triq Santa Marta (St. Martha Street), Victoria, Gozo – leading from Victoria, Gozo to Ix-Xewkija and Ix-Xagħra
Triq l-Isptar San Ġiljan (St. Julian's Hospital Street), Victoria, Gozo – leading from Victoria, Gozo to Fontana, Gozo
Triq Tal-Għajn (Spring Street), Fontana, Gozo – leading from Victoria, Gozo (Vajringa area) to Ix-Xlendi and Il-Munxar 
Triq ix-Xlendi (Xlendi Road), Fontana, Gozo – leading from Fontana, Gozo to Ix-Xlendi
Triq ir-Rabat (Victoria Road), Ix-Xlendi – leading from Ix-Xlendi centre to Fontana, Gozo and Victoria, Gozo 
Pjazza l-Anfori (Anfori Square), Ix-Xlendi – the main square of Ix-Xlendi

Route 11

From Ta' Kerċem to Żebbuġ, Gozo
Triq Wied il-Lunzjata (Lunzjata Valley Road), Ta' Kerċem – leading from Ta' Kerċem to Victoria, Gozo
Triq Ta' Kerċem (Kerċem Road), Victoria, Gozo – leading from Ta' Kerċem outskirts to Victoria, Gozo centre 
Triq Mons. Vella (Mgr. Vella Street), Victoria, Gozo – leading to Cittadella (Gozo) 
Triq Sant' Orsla (St. Ursula Street), Victoria, Gozo – leading from Cittadella (Gozo) to Victoria, Gozo outskirts 
Triq il-Papa Ġwanni Pawlu II (Pope John Paul II Street), Victoria, Gozo – leading from Victoria, Gozo to L-Għasri, L-Għarb and San Lawrenz
Triq l-Għasri (Għasri Road), L-Għasri – leading from Ta' Kerċem to L-Għasri 
Triq il-Wilġa (Wilġa Road), L-Għasri – L-Għasri centre
Triq iż-Żebbuġ (Żebbuġ Road), L-Għasri – leading from L-Għasri to Iż-Żebbuġ
Triq iż-Żebbuġ (Żebbuġ Road), Iż-Żebbuġ – leading from Wied Sara to Iż-Żebbuġ centre
Triq il-Knisja (Church Street), Iż-Żebbuġ – leading to Iż-Żebbuġ Parish Church
Triq l-Imgħallem (Foreman Street), Iż-Żebbuġ – leading from Victoria, Gozo to Iż-Żebbuġ

Route 12

From Ix-Xewkija to Victoria, Gozo
Triq il-Mitħna (Mill Street), Ix-Xewkija – leading from Ta' Ħamet to Ix-Xewkija centre 
Triq Tal-Ħamrija (Ħamrija Road), Ix-Xewkija – leading from Ix-Xewkija centre to Xewkija Industrial Estate
Triq Ta' Sannat (Sannat Road), Ix-Xewkija – leading from Xewkija Industrial Estate to Ta' Sannat and Mġarr ix-Xini 
Triq ix-Xewkija (Xewkija Road), Ta' Sannat – leading from Ta' Sannat to Ix-Xewkija
Triq Ta' Marżiena (Manresa Road), Ta' Sannat – leading from Ta' Sannat to Il-Munxar
Triq Santa Duminka (St. Domenica Street), Il-Munxar/Fontana, Gozo – leading from Il-Munxar to Fontana, Gozo and Victoria, Gozo 
Triq il-Kappillan Ġużeppi Hili (Chaplin Joseph Hili Street), Victoria, Gozo – leading from Fontana, Gozo to Victoria, Gozo
Triq Enrico Mizzi (Enrico Mizzi Street), Victoria, Gozo – leading to Victoria, Gozo centre 
Pjazza San Franġisk (St. Frances Square), Victoria, Gozo – Victoria main square 
Triq Għajn Qatet (Għajn Qatet Road), Victoria, Gozo – leading from Victoria, Gozo centre to Ix-Xewkija

Route 13

From Victoria, Gozo to Ta' Sannat
Triq Putirjal (City Gate Street), Victoria, Gozo – leading from Cittadella (Gozo) to Victoria, Gozo centre 
Pjazza San Franġisk (St. Frances Square), Victoria, Gozo – Victoria, Gozo centre main square
Triq Enrico Mizzi (Enrico Mizzi Street), Victoria, Gozo – leading from Victoria, Gozo to Fontana, Gozo and Taċ-Ċawla area 
Triq it-Tabib Anton Tabone (Dr. Anton Tabone Street), Victoria, Gozo – leading from Taċ-Ċawla area to Ta' Sannat 
Triq Ta' Sannat (Sannat Road), Victoria, Gozo/Ta' Sannat – leading to Ta' Sannat centre and Ta' Ċenċ Cliffs 
Triq Dun Xand Aquilina (Rev. X. Aquilina Street), Ta' Sannat – leading from Ta' Sannat centre to Ta' Seguna area and Il-Munxar

Route 15

From Mġarr, Gozo to Ramla Bay (Ix-Xagħra)
Triq l-Imġarr (Mġarr Road), Il-Qala – leading from Mġarr, Gozo to Il-Qala and Ħondoq ir-Rummien
Triq l-Isqof M. Buttiġieġ (Bishop Buttigieg Street), Il-Qala – leading to Il-Qala centre 
Triq it-Tempju (Temple Street), Il-Qala – leading from Il-Qala centre to Ta' Grunju and In-Nadur
Triq Ta' Grunju (Grunju Road), Il-Qala – leading from Il-Qala outskirts to Wied is-Simar and In-Nadur
Pjazza Repubblika (Republic Square), Il-Qala – crossroad between Il-Qala and In-Nadur
Triq il-Qala (Qala Road), In-Nadur – leading from Il-Qala to In-Nadur and Daħlet Qorrot
Triq it-Tiġrija (Racecourse Street), In-Nadur – leading from Daħlet Qorrot and San Blas, Nadur areas to In-Nadur centre and Ta' Kuxxina 
Triq il-Knisja (Church Street), In-Nadur – leading from In-Nadur centre to Ta' Ħida area and Victoria, Gozo
Triq Tal-Ħanaq (Ħanaq Road), In-Nadur – leading from In-Nadur centre to Binġemma area 
Triq Għajn Qasab (Għajn Qasab Road), In-Nadur – leading from Binġemma area to Ramla Bay
Triq ir-Ramla l-Ħamra (Ramla Bay Road), Ix-Xagħra – leading to Ramla Bay beach

Route 100

From L-Għarb to L-Għasri
Pjazza Gerano (Gerano Square), L-Għarb – L-Għarb centre
Triq Ta' Sdieri (Sdieri Road), L-Għarb – leading from L-Għarb to Ta' Pinu
Triq Ta' Għammar (Għammar Road), L-Għasri – leading from Ta' Pinu to Għammar
Triq il-Fanal (Lighthouse Street), L-Għasri – leading from Għammar and Ta' Gurdan Lighthouse to L-Għasri
Pjazza s-Salvatur (Our Saviour Square), L-Għasri – L-Għasri main square
Triq Salvu Gambin (S. Gambin Street), L-Għasri – leading from L-Għasri to Iż-Żebbuġ and Victoria, Gozo

Route 102

From L-Għarb to Ta' Pinu
Triq Ta' Pinu (Ta' Pinu Road), L-Għarb – leading from L-Għarb and Victoria, Gozo to Ta' Pinu

Route 103

From Żebbuġ, Gozo to Ix-Xagħra

Route 106

From Ta' Kerċem to Santa Luċija, Gozo

Route 107

From Ta' Kerċem to Għajn Abdul

Route 112

From Ix-Xewkija to Mġarr ix-Xini

Route 113

From Xlendi (Il-Munxar) to Ta' Ċenċ (Ta' Sannat)

Route 114

From Ix-Xagħra to Ramla Bay

These are the main roads and highways of Malta by locality:

Attard

B'Kara Road (Triq Birkirkara)- the road leading from Balzan and Birkirkara to Attard centre.
Hal Warda Road (Triq Ħal Warda) – the road leading from the outskirts of Attard, Mdina Road, to Attard centre.
Mdina Road (Triq l-Imdina) – the road leading from Birkirkara and Balzan to Ta' Qali, Rabat, Malta and Mdina.
National Stadium Avenue (Vjal l-Istadium Nazzjonali)- the road leading from Zebbug, Malta, Rabat, Malta and Mdina to Ta' Qali.
Notary Zarb Street (Triq in-Nutar Zarb) – the road leading from Attard to Balzan, San Anton Palace area, Birkirkara and Mriehel.
Old Railway Track (Triq il-Linja) – the road leading from San Anton Palace area to Attard centre.
Pitakli Street (Triq il-Pitkali) – the road leading from Attard centre to Misrah Kola and Ta' Qali.
St. Catherine Street (Triq Santa Katarina) – the road leading from Attard centre to Tal-Mirakli area, Lija and Mosta.
Tat-Torba Road (Triq Tat-Torba) – the road leading from Attard to Lija and Naxxar.
Zaghfran Street (Triq iż-Żagħfran) – This road connects Mdina Road with Notary Zarb Street.
Zebbug Road (Triq Ħaż-Żebbuġ) – The road leading from Attard to Zebbug, Malta and Siggiewi.
Tigan Street (Triq it-Tigan)

Balzan

Birbal Street (Triq Birbal) – the road leading from Attard to Birkirkara.
De Paule Avenue (Vjal de Paule) – the road leading from Balzan outskirts, Aqueduct area, to San Anton Palace and Balzan Centre.
Mdina Road (Triq l-Imdina) – This road is also known as Notabile Road. The road leading to Balzan from Fleur-de-Lys and Mriehel, Birkirkara, and Qormi.

Birgu

'79 Street (Triq '79) – the road leading from Bormla to Birgu centre
Cottonera Road (Triq il-Kottonera) – the main road of Tal-Hawli area.
St. Edward's Road (Triq San Dwardu) – the road leading from Zabbar to Birgu and Kalkara.
Vittoriosa Waterfront (Xatt il-Forn) – the road leading from Birgu centre to Cottonera Marina.

Birkirkara

Birkirkara Bypass (Dawret Birkirkara) – This road also known as Triq Dun Karm. This is the busiest road in Malta that connects Birkirkara, the most populated locality in Malta, with Lija, Balzan, Iklin, Naxxar, Mosta and the northern part of Malta from one side. And from the other side connects Birkirkara with Gharghur, San Gwann, Swatar, Msida, Mater Dei Hospital, University of Malta and the centre part and the southern part of Malta.
Fleur-de-Lys Road (Triq Fleur-de-Lys) – the road leading from Birkirkara to Fleur-de-Lys, Santa Venera, Hamrun, Mriehel and Qormi.
Mannarino Road (Triq Mannarinu) – the road leading from Birkirkara Valley to Ta' Paris, Swatar and Msida.
Naxxar Road (Triq in-Naxxar) – the road leading from Birkirkara Valley to Balzan, Lija, Iklin, Naxxar and Birkirkara Bypass.
Notabile Road (Triq Notabile) – This street is also known as Mdina Road. The road leading from Hamrun, Santa Venera and Birkirkara to Attard, Balzan, Mriehel and Rabat, Malta.
Psaila Street (Triq Salvu Psaila) – the road leading from Birkirkara to Santa Venera and Regional Road.
Valley Road (Triq il-Wied) – the road that connects different areas of Birkirkara altogether, like Ta' Paris, Fleur-de-Lys and Mriehel. This road also connects Birkirkara with Balzan.

Birzebbuga

B'Bugia Road (Triq Birżebbuġa)- The main road leading to Birzebbuga centre.
Ferretti Street (Triq F.M. Ferretti) – the road leading from Ghar Dalam area to Qajjenza and Marsaxlokk.
Ghar Dalam Road (Triq Għar Dalam) – This road known also as Zejtun Road. The road leading to Zejtun, Ghaxaq and Tal-Barrani Road.
Hal Far Road (Triq Ħal Far) – The main road of Hal Far. The road leading from Malta Freeport to Malta International Airport, Luqa, Gudja, and Zurrieq.
Pretty Bay Road – The road leading from Pretty Bay to Birzebbuga Centre
Qajjenza Road (Triq il-Qajjenza) – the road leading from Birzebbuga to Marsaxlokk and Delimara.
Sacred Heart Promenade (Dawret il-Qalb Imqaddsa) – the road leading from St. George's Bay to Pretty Bay.
St. Patrick's Road (Triq San Patrizju) – the road leading from Birzebbuga to Malta Freeport and Hal Far.

Bormla

8 December Road (Triq it-8 ta' Diċembru) – the main road between Birgu and Bormla, serve also as the main Cottonera bus terminus.
Cospicua Waterfront (Ix-Xatt ta' Bormla) – the road leading from Bormla centre to Fgura and Senglea.
Immaculate Street (Triq l-Immakulata) – the road leading from Bormla centre to Verdala and San Gwann t'Ghuxa area.
San Gwann t'Ghuxa Road (Triq San Ġwann t'Għuxa) – the road leading from San Gwann t'Ghuxa area to Senglea and Paola, Malta
Silver Jubilee Road (Triq il-Ġublew tal-Fidda) – the main road that leads to Bormla from Tal-Hawli area.
Three Cities Road (Triq it-Tlett Ibliet) – the road leading from Paola, Malta to Bormla and Senglea.

Dingli

Main Street (Triq il-Kbira) – the main road of Dingli centre.
Panoramic Street (Triq Panoramika) – the road leading from Dingli Cliffs to Siggiewi, Girgenti and Fawwara.
Rabat Road (Triq ir-Rabat) – the road leading from Dingli centre to Buskett, Rabat, Malta and Mdina.
Turretta Street (Triq it-Turretta) – the road leading from Dingli centre to Dingli Cliffs.

Fgura

Dejma Road (Triq id-Dejma) – the road leading to Tarxien, Bulebel and Zejtun.
Hompesch Road (Triq Hompesch) – the road leading from Fgura to Zabbar, Marsaskala and Zejtun.
Zabbar Road (Triq Ħaż-Żabbar) – the road leading from Fgura to Cottonera area and Paola, Malta.

Floriana

Floriana's Victims Street (Triq il-Vittmi Furjaniżi) – the road leading from Valletta Waterfront to Marsa, Malta. The main road for cruise liners terminal.
Independence Road (Triq l-Indipendenza) – the road leading from Floriana and Blata l-Bajda to Pieta', Malta, Msida and Sliema.
Lascaris Wharf (Xatt ta' Lascaris) – the main road that connect Floriana with Valletta from the harbor side.
National Road (Triq Nazzjonali) – the road leading from Floriana to Hamrun, Marsa, Malta and the South of Malta.
Pinto Wharf (Xatt ta' Pinto) – the road leading from Valletta Waterfront to Floriana centre and Valletta main terminus.
St. Anne Street (Triq Sant' Anna) – the road leading from Valletta to Floriana centre and Blata l-Bajda.

Gharghur

Tal-Balal Road (Triq Tal-Balal) – the road leading from San Gwann to Naxxar and Iklin.

Ghaxaq

Ghaxaq Bypass (Dawret Ħal Għaxaq) – the road leading to Tal-Barrani Road and Zejtun from one side, and from the other side to Gudja, Luqa, and Malta International Airport.

Gudja

Ghaxaq Road (Triq Ħal Għaxaq) – the road leading from Gudja to Ghaxaq.
Gudja Bypass (Dawret il-Gudja) – the road leading to Luqa, Malta International Airport, Hal Far and Kirkop.
Tarxien Road (Triq Ħal Tarxien) – the road leading from Gudja to Tarxien and Tal-Barrani Road.

Gżira

Gzira Strand (Triq ix-Xatt) – the road leading from Ta' Xbiex and Gżira to Sliema.
Msida Road (Triq l-Imsida) – the road leading from Msida and Ta' Xbiex to Gzira.
Rue d'Argens (Triq d'Argens) – This is the main road of Gzira, connecting Msida with Sliema (Mrabat area) and San Giljan.
Sliema Road (Triq Tas-Sliema) – This road is also known as Kappara Hill. This road connect Gzira with San Gwann, Kappara, Regional Road and University of Malta area.

Hamrun

Mountbatten Street (Triq Mountbatten) – This street is also known as Joe Sciberras Street. This street connect Hamrun with Pietà, Malta and Guardamangia.
Parish Priest Mifsud Street (Triq il-Kappillan Mifsud) – This street connects Hamrun (Immaculate Conception Parish area) with Santa Venera and Birkirkara. This street also leads to Regional Road.
St. Joseph High Street (Triq il-Kbira San Ġużepp) – The principle road of Hamrun, known also as Strada Rjali (Royal Street). This road, that starts from Blata l-Bajda, connecting Valletta with Santa Venera, Birkirkara (Malta largest city), Attard, Qormi and other cities in the centre of Malta.

Iklin

Geronimo Abos Street (Triq Geronimo Abos) – the main road of Lower Iklin. The road leading from Birkirkara Bypass to Iklin centre.
Valley Road (Triq il-Wied) – the main road of Upper Iklin. The road leading from Iklin centre to Naxxar, Gharghur and San Gwann.

Kalkara

Italian Mission Street (Triq il-Missjoni Taljana) – the road leading from Rinella Bay to Smart City
Kalkara Strand (Ix-Xatt) – the road leading from Birgu to Kalkara centre
Marina Road (Triq il-Marina) – the road leading from Kalkara centre to Rinella Bay
St. Rocco Street (Triq Santu Rokku) – the main road of Smart City
Alexander barri bi qrun ta' cerva

Kirkop

Industry Road (Triq l-Industrija) – the road leading from Kirkop to Zurrieq and Mqabba.
Kirkop Tunnels (Triq il-Mini ta' Ħal Kirkop) – the road leading from Kirkop to the Malta International Airport, Luqa and the South of Malta.

Lija

Mosta Road (Triq il-Mosta) – the road, after Lija Cemetery, leading from Lija and Iklin to Mosta and Naxxar.
Naxxar Road (Triq in-Naxxar) – the road, before Lija Cemetery, leading from Lija and Iklin to Mosta and Naxxar.
Pantar Road (Triq Pantar) – the road leading from Mosta and Naxxar to Ta' Qali and Attard.

Luqa

Aviation Avenue (Vjal l-Avjazzjoni) – the road connecting Luqa centre with the Malta International Airport, Hal Far, Gudja, and Kirkop.
Council of Europe Street (Triq il-Kunsill tal-Ewropa) – the road leading from Luqa to Santa Lucija, Paola, Malta, and Marsa, Malta.
Qormi Road (Triq Ħal Qormi) – the road leading from Hal Farrug to Qormi.
St. Thomas Street (Triq San Tumas) – the road leading from Luqa centre to Malta International Airport, Hal Farrug, and Qormi.

Marsa, Malta

13 December Road (Triq Diċembru Tlettax) – The road leading from Valletta and Floriana, Malta area to Marsa centre and Albert Town.
Aldo Moro Street (Triq Aldo Moro) – This road that connects the south of Malta with Valletta Harbor area is also known as Trunk Road or Millennia Road. This road connects Marsa with Qormi, Luqa, Paola and the Malta International Airport.
Belt il-Hazna Road (Triq Belt il-Ħażna) – the road leading from Albert Town to the Menqa area, the Valletta Harbor.
Coal Wharf (Moll il-Faħam) – one of the busiest wharfs in Malta.
Flagstone Wharf (Moll iċ-Ċangaturi) – the wharf leading from the Menqa area, Valletta Harbor, to Marsa centre.
Ghammieri Road (Triq l-Għammieri) – This road known also as Ingiered Street. The road leading from Albert Town and Marsa Sports Complex to Marsa Industrial Estate and Qormi.
Labour Road (Triq il-Labour) – the road connecting Marsa, Albert Town area, with Paola, Malta.
Marsa Cross Street (Triq is-Salib tal-Marsa) – the main road of Marsa, Holy Trinity Parish area, leading from Albert Town to Marsa centre.
Marsa-Hamrun Bypass (Dawret il-Marsa u l-Ħamrun) – the bypass leading from Marsa to Qormi, Santa Venera tunnels, Hamrun and the centre part of Malta.
Wine Wharf (Triq l-Għassara tal-Għeneb) – the wharf leading from Marsa, Menqa area, to Floriana, Malta and Valletta Waterfront.

Marsaskala

Blajjiet Street (Triq il-Blajjiet) – the road leading from Zabbar to Zonqor.
Marina Street (Triq ix-Xatt) – the main road of Marsaskala Bay.
Qaliet Street (Triq il-Qaliet) – the main road of St. Thomas Bay.
St. Anne Street (Triq Sant' Anna) – the main road between the new Marsaskala Bypass and the old one.
St. Anthony Street (Triq Sant' Antnin) – the main road leading to Marsaskala Bypass in Zabbar.
Tal-Gardiel Road (Triq Tal-Gardiel) – the road leading from St. Thomas Bay to Marsaskala Bay.
Zabbar Road (Triq San Ġwakkin) – the road leading from Marsaskala to Zabbar, known also as the old bypass.
Zonqor Road (Triq iż-Żonqor) – the road leading from Marsaskala to Zonqor.

Marsaxlokk

Fishermen Strand (Xatt is-Sajjieda) – the main road of Marsaxlokk
Entrenchment Road (Triq it-Trunċiera) – the road leading from Marsaxlokk to Qajjenza and Birzebbuga.
Zejtun Road (Triq iż-Żejtun) – the road leading from Marsaxlokk to Zejtun and Tal-Barrani Road.

Mdina

Tal-Infetti Road (Triq Tal-Infetti) – the road leading from Buqana Road, Ta' Qali and Mosta to Rabat, Malta and Mdina area.

Mellieha

George Borg Olivier Street (Triq Ġorġ Borġ Olivier) – the main road of Mellieha centre.
Louis Wettinger Street (Triq Louis Wettinger) – This road also known as the northern part of Mellieha Bypass. This road connects Selmun area with Ta' Pennellu area in Mellieha.
Mellieha Bypass (Dawret il-Mellieħa) – the road connects whole Malta with the northeast part of the island, such as Cirkewwa, Marfa, Armier and Ghadira Bay. This is the most busiest road in Mellieha. This road connects Malta with Gozo and Comino, because traffic has to pass from this bypass to catch the Gozo Ferry or the Comino and Kemmunett ferries. At this moment is under construction and people are using Anchor Bay Road.
Main Street (Triq il-Kbira) – the road leading from Mellieha outskirts, Belleview area, to Mellieha centre.
Marfa Road (Triq il-Marfa) – the road leading from Mellieha centre to Ghadira Beach, Armier, Marfa, Cirkewwa and Paradise Bay. During this road there is the Gozo Ferry and Comino and Cominotto ferries.
Mellieha Road (Triq il-Mellieħa) – the road leading from Mellieha to Manikata and Ghajn Tuffieha.
St. Paul's Bay Road (Triq San Pawl il-Baħar) – This road is also known as Xemxija Hill, Mistra Hill or Selmun Hill. The road leading from San Pawl il-Bahar to Mellieha and Cirkewwa.

Mgarr

Golden Bay Road (Triq Għajn Tuffieħa) – the road leading from Zebbiegh to Ghajn Tuffieha, Manikata and Mellieha.
Mosta Road (Triq il-Mosta) – the road leading from Mgarr to Mosta, Ta' Qali and the centre of Malta.
Roman Baths Street (Triq il-Banjijiet Rumani) – the road leading from Mgarr to Zebbiegh, Ghajn Tuffieha and Manikata.
Sir Temi Zammit Street (Triq Sir Temi Zammit) – the main road of Zebbiegh.

Mosta

Constitution Street (Triq il-Kostituzzjoni) – the road leading from Mosta centre to Targa Gap, Burmarrad, Bidnija and the northern part of Malta.
Durumblat Road (Triq Durumblat) – the road leading from Attard to Mosta, Ta' Mlit area, and Ta' Qali.
Eucharistic Congress Street (Triq il-Kungress Ewkaristiku) – the road leading from Mosta centre to Mosta Technopark, Lija and Birkirkara areas.
Frances Pisani Street (Triq Franġisk Pisani) – the road leading from Mosta, Sghajtar area, to Naxxar, Mosta Technopark, Lija and Birkirkara.
Independence Avenue (Vjal l-Indipendenza) – the road leading from Birkirkara, Lija, Iklin and the centre of Malta to Mosta, Ta' Mlit and Blata l-Gholja areas.
Main Street (Triq il-Kbira) – the road leading from Ta' Qali, Mgarr and Mosta, Blata l-Gholja area, to Mosta centre and Naxxar.
Maltese Missioners Street (Triq il-Missjunarji Maltin) – the road leading from Rabat, Malta, Mdina, Ta' Qali and Mgarr to Burmarrad, Bidnija, Mosta (Targa Gap and Ta' Zokkrija areas), and the northern part of Malta.
Millbrae Avenue (Vjal Millbrae) – the road leading from Mosta, Targa Gap area, to Bidnija and Burmarrad.
Mosta Heroes Avenue (Vjal il-Qalbiena Mostin) – the road leading from Mosta, Santa Margarita area, to Naxxar and Sghajtar area.
San Pawl tal-Qliegha Road (Triq San Pawl tal-Qliegħa) – the road leading from Mgarr and Rabat, Malta to Ta' Qali and Mosta, Tas-Sriedek area.
St. Anton Abbot Street (Triq San Anton Abbati) – One of the roads that connect Mosta with Naxxar.
Valletta Road (Triq Valletta) – the road leading from Mosta Technopark area to Naxxar, Iklin, Lija, Ta' Qali and the centre of Malta.

Mqabba

Mqabba Road (Triq l-Imqabba) – the road leading from Mqabba to Kirkop, Zurrieq and the Malta International Airport.
Qrendi Road (Triq il-Qrendi) – the road leading from Mqabba to Qrendi and Hagar Qim.
St. Mary's Convoy Road (Triq il-Konvoj ta' Santa Marija) – the main road of Mqabba that connects this locality with Qrendi.

Msida

M.A. Vassalli Street (Triq Mikiel Anton Vassalli) – Part of this street is also known as Regional Road. This road connects the south of Malta and Valletta area with San Gwann, Birkirkara, Swieqi, University of Malta, Mater Dei Hospital, Santa Venera, Swatar and the north of Malta.
Msida Strand (Ix-Xatt tal-Imsida) – this area is also known as Menqa Square, Msida Square, or 5 October Square. This is one of the busiest areas in Malta. This area connects the capital city, Valletta, area with Birkirkara, Ta' Xbiex, Mater Dei Hospital, University of Malta, Gżira, Sliema, Santa Venera and Regional Road.
Msida Valley Road (Triq il-Wied tal-Imsida) – the road leading from Msida centre to Birkirkara, Santa Venera and Swatar.
Rue d'Argens (Triq d'Argens) – the road leading from Msida to Ta' Xbiex, Gżira, Sliema, San Gwann and San Giljan.

Mtarfa

Exiled Maltese Street (Triq il-Maltin Internati u Eżiljati) – This road is also known as Mtarfa Bypass. This road connects Mtarfa with Rabat, Malta, Mdina and the centre of Malta.
Vincenzo Bonello Street (Triq il-Kavallier Vincenzo Bonello) – The road leading from Mtarfa Bypass to Buqana Road, Ta' Qali and Mosta.

Naxxar

21 September Avenue (Vjal il-21 ta' Settembru) – the road leading from Naxxar centre to Sghajtar and Santa Margarita areas and Mosta.
Coast Road (Tul il-Kosta) – the main road leading from Sliema, San Giljan, Paceville, Swieqi, Madliena, Pembroke, Malta and the centre of Malta to Bahar ic-Caghaq, Naxxar, San Pawl il-Bahar, Bugibba/Qawra and the northern part of Malta.
Fort Mosta Street (Triq il-Fortizza tal-Mosta) – the road leading from Naxxar to Mosta, Santa Margarita and Targa Gap areas.
Labour Avenue (Vjal il-Labour) – the main road of Naxxar. The road leading from Birkirkara, Iklin lower part, Lija, Mosta and the centre of Malta to Naxxar centre.
M. Murray Street (Triq M. Murray) – the road leading from Naxxar centre, Iklin and San Gwann to Birguma, Gharghur and T'Alla u Ommu Hill.
Parish Street (Triq il-Parroċċa) – the road leading from San Gwann, Iklin and Gharghur to Naxxar centre.
St. Paul's Street (Triq San Pawl) – the main road leading from Naxxar centre, Iklin and Gharghur to San Pawl tat-Targa, Birguma, T'All u Ommu Hill, and the northern part of Malta.
T'Alla u Ommu Hill (Telgħa T'Alla u Ommu) – This road is also known as Salini Road. The road leading from Naxxar to Maghtab, Salini, San Pawl il-Bahar, Bugibba/Qawra, Burmarrad and the northern part of Malta.

Paola, Malta

28 April Avenue (Vjal it-28 ta' April) – This road known also as Il-Benniena. The road leading from Paola to Fgura.
Corradino Road (Triq Kordin) – the main road of Corradino area, connecting Paola with Fgura and Marsa, Malta.
Cospicua Road (Triq Bormla) – the road leading to Corradino Industrial Estate, MCAST, Ghajn Dwieli and Cottonera area.
Ghajn Dwieli Road (Triq Għajn Dwieli) – the road leading from Paola to Bormla and Senglea.
Paola Hill (Telgħat Raħal Ġdid) – the road leading from Paola centre to Corradino Industrial Estate and Harbor area.
Paola Square (Pjazza Antoine de Paule) – the main road of Paola centre.
Sir Paul Boffa Avenue (Vjal Sir Paul Boffa) – the road leading from Paola to Marsa, Malta.
St. Lucia Avenue (Vjal Santa Luċija) – the road leading from Marsa, Malta to Santa Lucija, Tarxien and Tal-Barrani Road.
Valletta Road (Triq il-Belt Valletta) – This road known also as Prison Street. The road leading from Paola centre to Ta' Lourdes area.

Pembroke, Malta

Profs. W. Ganado Street (Triq il-Profs. W. Ganado) – the road leading from Pembroke and St. Andrew's Road to Paceville and St. George's Bay.

Pietà, Malta

Marina Street (Triq ix-Xatt) – The main road that connects Valletta with the Marsamxett Harbour cities, like Sliema, Gżira, Ta' Xbiex and Msida. This street also connects Valletta with the University of Malta and Malta national hospital, Mater Dei Hospital.
W. Bonnici Street (Triq W. Bonnici) – The road leading from Pieta', Sa Maison area, to Valletta, Blata l-Bajda and Hamrun.

Qormi

Guze' Duca Street (Triq Ġużè Duca) – This road form part of Mdina Road, Qormi. This road connects Qormi with Tal-Handaq Industrial Estate.
Luqa Road (Triq Ħal Luqa) – the road leading from Qormi to Hal Farrug, Luqa, the Malta International Airport and the south of Malta.
Manuel Dimech Street (Triq Manwel Dimech) – the road leading from Hamrun, Marsa Racecourse and Marsa Park and Ride to Qormi, St. Sebastian Parish, centre.
Mdina Road (Triq l-Imdina) – the road leading from Marsa, Malta and Luqa to Zebbug, Malta, Siggiewi, Rabat, Malta and north of Malta.
Mill Street (Triq il-Mitħna) – the road leading from Qormi, St. George Parish, to Santa Venera and Birkirkara.
Mriehel Bypass (Dawret l-Imrieħel) – Part of this street is also known as Triq is-Sebh. The road leading from Marsa, Malta, Marsa-Hamrun Bypass, and Regional Road to Mriehel, Attard, Balzan and the centre of Malta.

Qrendi

Hagar Qim Road (Triq Ħaġar Qim) – the road leading from Qrendi centre to Hagar Qim and Blue Grotto area.
Tempest Street (Triq it-Tempesta) – the road leading from Qrendi to Mqabba or the Maqluba area.

Rabat, Malta

Buqana Road (Triq Buqana) – the road leading from Mdina Road, Zebbug, Malta, to Ta' Qali, Mosta and the north of Malta.
College Street (Triq il-Kulleġġ) – the main road of Rabat, St. Dominic's area, that connect Rabat centre with Tal-Virtu'.
Dingli Road (Triq Ħad-Dingli) – the road leading from Rabat to Dingli.
Hal Tartarni Road – the road leading from Rabat centre to Buskett.
Saqqajja Hill (Triq Ħal Tartarni) – the road leading from Valletta and the centre of Malta to Rabat, Mdina, Mtarfa and Dingli.
St. Rita's Street (Triq Santa Rita) – the main road in front of Rabat Parish Church. The road leading from Rabat centre to Mdina, Mtarfa and the centre of Malta.

San Giljan

Birkirkara Road (Triq Birkirkara) – the road leading from Balluta Bay and Sliema (Mrabat area) to San Gwann.
Church Street (Triq il-Knisja) – the road leading from Paceville centre to Portomaso and San Giljan.
Dragonara Road (Triq id-Dragunara) – the road leading from St. George's Bay to Paceville centre, Portomaso and San Giljan.
George Borg Olivier Street (Triq Ġorġ Borġ Olivier) – the road leading from Balluta Bay to Spinola and San Giljan centre.
Gort Street (Triq Gort) – the road leading from Paceville centre to St. Andrew's Road. This serve also as Paceville main bus terminus.
Main Street (Triq il-Kbira) – the road leading from Sliema to Balluta Bay.
Michelangelo Borg Street (Triq Mikielanġ Borġ) – the road leading from San Giljan centre to Regional Road, San Gwann and Ta' Giorni.
Ross Street (Triq Ross) – the road leading from Portomaso to Spinola Bay.
St. George's Beach (Ix-Xatt ta' San Ġorġ) – the road leading from Pembroke, Malta to Paceville and San Giljan.
St. George's Road (Triq San Ġorġ) – the road leading from San Giljan centre, Spinola Bay, to Paceville.
St. Augustine Street (Triq Santu Wistin) – the road leading from Swieqi to Paceville and St. George's Bay.

San Gwann

Bellavista Road (Triq Bellavista) – the road leading from Kappara and Regional Road to Mater Dei Hospital, Ta' Zwejt, San Gwann Industrial Estate and Tal-Balal Road.
Kappara Hill (Triq Tas-Sliema) – This road is also known as Sliema Road. The road leading from Gżira to Kappara and San Gwann centre.
Mensija Road (Triq il-Mensija) – the road leading from San Gwann centre to Mensija, Ta' Giorni and Swieqi.
Naxxar Road (Triq in-Naxxar) – the road leading from San Giljan, Balluta Bay and Sliema (Mrabat area) to San Gwann.
Rihan Avenue (Vjal ir-Riħan) – the road leading from Kappara and Mensija to Ta' Zwejt, Gharghur, Naxxar and Iklin.

San Pawl il-Bahar

Burmarrad Road (Triq Burmarrad) – the road leading from Mosta and Bidnija to Burmarrad, St. Paul's Bay area and the northern part of Malta.
Ghajn Tuffieha Road (Triq Għajn Tuffieħa) – the road leading from St. Paul's Bay, Xemxija and Bugibba to Ghajn Tuffieha, Mgarr and Manikata.
Islets Promenade (Dawret il-Gżejjer) – the road leading from St. Paul's Bay and Bugibba Promenade to Bay Square, Perched Beach, Ta' Fra Ben Bay and Qawra.
Kennedy Drive – The road leading from Bahar ic-Caghaq, Salini and Naxxar to Qawra, Bugibba, St. Paul's Bay, Xemxija and Burmarrad.
Mosta Road (Triq il-Mosta) – the road leading from Bugibba and Burmarrad to St. Paul's Bay centre.
Parades Street (Triq Parades) – This road along with St. Paul's Street forms the main road of St. Paul's Bay centre.
Pioneers' Corp Street (Triq il-Korp tal-Pijunieri) – the main road that connects Bugibba and Qawra, one of the busiest tourist resorts in Malta.
Pwales Beach (Xatt il-Pwales) – the road leading from St. Paul's Bay centre to Xemxija.
Qawra Promenade (Dawret il-Qawra) – This is the main road of Qawra, one the busiest area in this tourist resort. This road connects Qawra with San Pawl il-Bahar, Burmarrad, Mosta, Naxxar and Salini Bay.
St. Paul's Street (Triq San Pawl) – This is the main roads of St. Paul's Bay centre. This road connects Bugibba and Qawra with St. Paul's Bay and Xemxija.
St. Paul's Bay Bypass (Dawret San Pawl) – the road leading from Burmarrad, Mosta and Bugibba to Xemxija, Ghajn Tuffieha and Mellieha area.
Trunciera Road (Triq it-Trunċiera) – the road leading from Bugibba, Bugibba Terminus, to Ta' Fra Ben Bay and Qawra Promenade.
Waves Street (Triq il-Ħalel) – the road leading from Bugibba Promenade and Qawra to Bugibba centre.
Wileg Street (Triq il-Wileġ) – the road leading from Qawra Promenade to Bugibba centre and St. Paul's Bay.
Xemxija Hill (Telgħat ix-Xemxija) – This is the main promenade of Xemxija hamlet. This road connects St. Paul's Bay area with Mellieha. All the traffic to catch the Gozo Ferry has to pass from this road.

Santa Lucija

Luqa Road (Triq Ħal Luqa) – the road leading Paola, Malta with Luqa and Malta International Airport.
 Dawret it-Torri (Tower By-Pass)
 Triq Katarina Vitale (Catherine Vitale Street)
 Triq Marija DeDominicis (Maria De Dominicas Street)
 Triq il-Begonja (Begonia Street)
 Triq il-Pepprin (Poppies Street)
 Triq il-Prinjoli (Aleppo Pine Street)
 Triq Tal-Barrani (Tal-Barrani Road)
 Vjal l-Oleandri (Oleandri Avenue)

Santa Venera

Canon Road (Triq il-Kanun) – the road leading from Birkirkara and Fleur-de-Lys to Qormi and Mriehel Bypass.
Old Railway Track (Triq il-Ferrovija l-Qadima) – the road leading from Hamrun (Immaculate Conception Parish) and Regional Road to Birkirkara Valley.
Regional Road (Triq Reġjonali) – the road that connects the south of Malta with the centre and north of Malta. The road leading from Marsa, Malta to Msida, Birkirkara, Hamrun, Santa Venera, Mater Dei Hospital, University of Malta, Gżira and Sliema areas.
St. Joseph High Street (Triq il-Kbira San Ġużepp) – the road leading from Hamrun to Birkirkara, Fluer-de-Lys, Mriehel, Attard and Balzan.

Siggiewi

Blat il-Qamar Street (Triq Blat il-Qamar) – the road leading from Siggiewi to Dingli, Buskett, Rabat, Malta and Mdina.
Dr. Nicholas Zammit Street (Triq it-Tabib Nikol Zammit) – The road leading from Siggiewi Bypass to Girgenti.
Lapsi Street (Triq Lapsi) – The road leading from Siggiewi centre to Ghar Lapsi, Hagar Qim and Tal-Providenza areas.
Mgr. Michael Azzopardi Street (Triq Mons. Mikiel Azzopardi) – This road known also as Siggiewi Bypass. The road that connects Siggiewi with Zebbug, Malta, Qormi and the centre of Malta.
Mqabba Road (Triq l-Imqabba) – The road leading from Siggiewi to Mqabba, Hal Farrug, Luqa and the Malta International Airport.
Qrendi Road (Triq il-Qrendi) – This road form part of the Siggiewi Bypass, Mgr. Michael Azzopardi Street, that connects Siggiewi with Zebbug, Malta and the centre of Malta.
Ta' Kilpa Road (Triq Ta' Kilpa) – the road leading from Siggiewi centre to Qrendi.

Sliema

Manuel Dimech Street (Triq Manwel Dimech) – the road leading from Sliema Ferries to Mrabat and Balluta Bay.
Qui-Si-Sana Strnd (Ix-Xatt ta' Qui-Si-Sana) – the road leading from Tower Road to Tigne Point.
The Strand (Ix-Xatt) – this road also known as Sliema Ferries. The road leading from Gżira, Msida and Ta' Xbiex to Sliema commercial area.
Tigne' Strand (Ix-Xatt ta' Tigne') – the road leading from Sliema Ferries to Tigne Point.
Tower Road (Triq it-Torri) – the main road of Sliema. This road stretch from through the Sliema promenade, that connects Gżira and Sliema (Ferries area and Tigne Point) with San Giljan, Balluta Bay and Paceville.

Swieqi

St. Andrew's Road (Triq Sant' Andrija) – the road leading from San Gwann, San Giljan and Sliema area, and Regional Road to Madliena, Bahar ic-Caghaq, San Pawl il-Bahar and the northern part of Malta.

Ta' Xbiex

Abate Rigord Street (Triq l-Abate Rigord) – the road leading from Gżira and Sliema to Ta' Xbiex centre and Msida.
Ta' Xbiex Strand (Ix-Xatt ta' Ta' Xbiex) – the promenade leading from Sliema and Gżira to Msida.
Testaferrata Street (Triq Testaferrata) – the road leading from Msida to Sliema area.

Tarxien

St. Leonard Street (Triq San Anard) – This road known also as Bulebel Road.  This road connects Bulebel area with Fgura, Zejtun, Ghaxaq, Gudja, Santa Lucija, and Tal-Barrani Road.

Valletta (Capital City)

Great Sirge Road (Triq l-Assedju l-Kbir) – The main road that connect Floriana, Malta with Valletta. This road is near the largest square in Malta, Fosos Square.
Marsamxett Road (Triq Marsamxett) – This road form part of the Valletta Ring Road, that connects Floriana, Malta, Belt-is-Sebh area, with Fort St. Elmo and Marsamxett Harbour.
Mediterranean Street (Triq il-Mediterran) – This road with Quarry Wharf form part of the Valletta Ring Road, the Valletta Harbor side.
Quarry Wharf (Xatt il-Barriera) – This wharf form part of the Valletta Ring Road. This road connects Valletta Waterfront with Fort St. Elmo.
St. Elmo Place (Pjazza Sant' Iermu) – The busiest area at the tip of Valletta, near Fort St. Elmo.

Zabbar

Convent Street (Triq il-Kunvent) – the road leading from Zabbar outskirts to Zabbar centre.
Hompesch Gate Street (Triq il-Mina ta' Hompesch) – the road leading from Zabbar to Fgura.
Labour Road (Triq Tal-Labour) – the road leading from Zabbar to Birgu, Bormla and Kalkara.
Marsaskala Bypass (Triq Villabate) – the main road leading from Zabbar to Marsaskala.
Marsaskala Road (Triq Wied il-Għajn) – the old road leading from Zabbar to Marsaskala.
Sanctuary Street (Triq is-Santwarju) – the main road of Zabbar.
St. Leonard's Street (Triq San Leonardu) – the main road of St. Peter's hamlet, leading from Xghajra to Kalkara.
Xghajra Road (Triq ix-Xgħajra) – the road leading from Zabbar centre to Xghajra.

Zebbug, Malta

Attard Road (Triq Ħ'Attard) – the road leading from Zebbug to Attard, Balzan and the centre part of Malta.
Freedom Avenue (Vjal il-Ħelsien) – the main road of Zebbug. This road leads from Zebbug outskirt to Zebbug centre.
Mdina Road (Triq l-Imdina) – the road leading from Qormi, Luqa and the southern part of Malta to Mdina, Rabat, Malta, Ta' Qali, Mosta and the centre part of Malta.
Siggiewi Road (Triq is-Siġġiewi) – the road leading from Qormi and Zebbug, Malta to Siggiewi, Ghar Lapsi and Zurrieq area.

Zejtun

Cospicua Road (Triq Bormla) – This road also known as Tac-Cawsli Road. Leading from Zejtun to Fgura, Zabbar and Cottonera.
President Anton Buttigieg Street (Triq il-President Anton Buttigieg) – the main bypass of Zejtun, leads to Marsaskala, Ghaxaq, Bir id-Deheb and Tal-Barrani road.
St. Thomas Bay Road (Triq id-Daħla ta' San Tumas) – This road leading from Zejtun to Marsaskala and St. Thomas Bay.
Tal-Barrani Road (Triq Tal-Barrani) – the main road that leads from the south of Malta to the centre of Malta. This road principally leads from Zejtun to Tarxien, Ghaxaq, Gudja, Santa Lucija, Paola, Malta, Marsaxlokk and Birzebbuga.
Xrobb l-Ghagin Road (Triq Xrobb l-Għaġin) – This road leading from Zejtun to Marsaxlokk and Delimara.

Zurrieq

Blue Grotto Avenue (Vjal il-Blu Grotto) – the main road of Zurrieq, leading from Zurrieq and Safi, Malta to Wied iz-Zurrieq and Blue Grotto.
Valletta Road (Triq Valletta) – the road leading from Zurrieq to Kirkop, Mqabba and the Malta International Airport.
Wied iz-Zurrieq Road (Triq Wied iż-Żurrieq) – the main road that leads to Wied iz-Zurrieq, Blue Grotto, Hagar Qim, and Ghar Lapsi area.

Gozo

Fontana, Gozo

Fontana Road (Triq l-Għajn) – the road leading from Victoria, Malta to Fontana, Malta centre, Munxar and Xlendi.

Ghajnsielem

Borg Gharib Road (Triq Borġ Għarib) – the road leading from Ghajnsielem outskirts to Qala.
Mgarr Road (Triq l-Imġarr) – the road leading from Mgarr (Gozo) and Ghajnsielem to Victoria, Malta, Xewkija and the western part of Gozo.
St. Anthony's Street (Triq Sant' Antnin) – the road leading from Mgarr (Gozo) and Ghajnsielem to Nadur and Qala.

Gharb

Church Street (Triq il-Knisja) – the road leading from Gharb outskirts, Frances Portelli Street, to Gharb centre.
Frances Portelli Street (Triq Franġisk Portelli) – the road leading from Ta' Pinu area to San Lawrenz.
Gharb Road (Triq l-Għarb) – the road leading from Victoria, Malta and Ghasri outskirts to Gharb, Ta' Pinu and San Lawrenz.
Our Lady of Virtues Street (Triq il-Madonna tal-Virtut) – the road leading from Gharb centre to Birbuba hamlet.
Santu Pietru Road (Triq Santu Pietru) – the road leading from Birbuba hamlet to Santu Pietru hamlet.
Ta' Pinu Road (Triq Ta' Pinu) – the road leading from Gharb outskirts to Ta' Pinu, Ghasri and Ghammar hamlet.

Ghasri

Ghammar Road (Triq Ta' Għammar) – the road leading from Ta' Pinu and Ghammar hamlet to Ghasri centre.
Lantern Street (Triq il-Fanal) – the road leading from Ta' Gurdan lighthouse and Tal-Fanal Village complex to Ghasri centre.
Savior Gambin Street (Triq Salvu Gambin) – the main road of Ghasri centre.
Zebbug Road (Triq iż-Żebbuġ) – the road leading from Ghasri to Zebbug, Gozo and Sara Valley.

Kercem

Advocate Calleja Street (Triq l-Avukat Calleja) – the main street to Kercem centre.
Santa Katarina tal-Qabbieza Street (Triq Santa Katarina tal-Qabbieża) – the road leading from Kercem and Santa Lucija to Gharb.
St. Paul's Estate Street (Triq Qasam San Pawl) – the road leading from Kercem centre to Santa Lucija hamlet.
Ta' Xuxa Road (Triq Ta' Xuxa) – the road leading from Kercem centre to Victoria, Malta and Fontana, Gozo.

Munxar

Kalkara tal-Gir Street (Triq il-Kalkara tal-Ġir) – the road leading from Munxar to Sannat and Ta' Cenc Cliffs.
Qsajjem Road (Triq il-Qsajjem) – the road connecting Munxar with Xlendi.
Ras il-Bajjada Street (Triq Ras il-Bajjada) – the road leading from Munxar centre to Xlendi.
St. Simon Street (Triq San Xmun) – the road leading from Kantra Valley to Xlendi centre.
Victoria Road (Triq ir-Rabat) – the road leading from Xlendi to Fontana, Malta and Victoria, Malta.

Nadur

Ghajn Qasab Road (Triq Għajn Qasab) – the road leading from Nadur and Ta' Bingemma area to Ramla Bay and Xaghra.
Hanaq Road (Triq Ta' Ħanaq) – the main road of Ta' Hida area.
Mgarr Road (Triq l-Imġarr) – the road leading from Nadur to Ghajnsielem and Mgarr (Gozo).
Qala Road (Triq il-Qala) – the road leading from Nadur to Qala.
Racecourse Street (Triq it-Tiġrija) – the main road of Nadur centre.
Ramla Bay Road (Triq ir-Ramla) – the road leading from Nadur centre to Ta' Bingemma area and Ramla Bay.
Victoria Road (Triq ir-Rabat) – the road leading from Nadur to Victoria, Malta, Ta' Xhajma Racecourse and Xewkija.
Xandriku Street (Triq Xandriku) – the road leading from Nadur centre to the road leading to Mgarr (Gozo) and Ghajnsielem.

Qala

Hondoq Bay Road (Triq Ħondoq ir-Rummien) – the road leading from Qala to Hondoq ir-Rummien Bay.
Immaculate Conception Street (Triq il-Kunċizzjoni) – the main road of Qala centre.
Mgarr Road (Triq l-Imġarr) – the road leading from Qala to Mgarr (Gozo) and Ghajnsielem.

San Lawrenz

Frances Portelli Street (Triq Franġisk Portelli) – the road leading from Gharb and Victoria, Malta to San Lawrenz centre.
Fungus Rock Road (Triq il-Ġebla tal-Ġeneral) – the road leading from San Lawrenz centre to Dwejra and the Azure Window area.
Ghajn Abdul Road (Triq Għajn Abdul) – the road leading from San Lawrenz to St. Ralph's Pond, Kercem.
Rokon Street (Triq ir-Rokon) – the road next to San Lawrenz main tourist resort complex.
Wileg Road (Triq il-Wileġ)- the road leading from San Lawrenz centre to Santu Pietru hamlet, Gharb.

Sannat

Kalkar tal-Gir Street (Triq il-Kalkara tal-Ġir) – the road leading from Sannat centre to Munxar.
Ta' Cenc Road (Triq Ta' Ċenċ) – the road leading from Sannat to Victoria, Malta and Ta' Cenc Cliffs.

Victoria, Gozo (Gozo's capital)

Archbishop Peter Pace Street (Triq l-Arċisqof Pietru Pace) – the road leading from Victoria center to Gozo General Hospital.
Capuchin Street (Triq il-Kapuċċini) – the road leading from Victoria to Marsalforn.
City Gate Street (Triq Putirjal) – the road leading from St. Frances Square area to Gozo Main Bus Terminus and shopping centers area.
Dawwara Road (Triq id-Dawwara) – the road leading from Victoria to Fontana, Malta and Xlendi.
Dr. Anton Tabone Street (Triq it-Tabib Anton Tabone) – the road leading from Victoria to Sannat and Munxar.
Enrico Mizzi Street (Triq Neriku Mizzi) – the road leading from Victoria centre to Tac-Cawla area.
Foreman Street (Triq l-Imgħallem) – the road leading from Victoria to Zebbug, Gozo.
Fortunato Mizzi Street (Triq Fortunato Mizzi) – the road leading from Victoria centre to Xewkija, Xaghra, Ta' Xhajma Racecourse, Nadur and Qala.
Gedrin Street (Triq Gedrin) – the road leading from Victoria to Kercem and Lunzjata Valley.
Mgarr Road (Triq l-Imġarr) – the road leading from Victoria to Xewkija, Gozo Stadium, Ghajnsielem and Mgarr (Gozo).
Pope John Paul II Street (Triq il-Papa Ġwanni Pawlu II)  – the road leading from Victoria centre to Gharb, Ghasri, San Lawrenz, Ta' Pinu and Dwejra.
Republic Street (Triq ir-Repubblika) – the main street that connects Victoria with The Citadel.
St. Frances Square (Pjazza San Franġisk) – the busiest area of Gozo.
St. Ursula Street (Triq Sant' Orsla) – the road leading from The Citadel to Savina area and the roads leading to the Western part of Gozo.
Vajringa Street (Triq Vajringa) – the road connecting Tomba area with St. Francis Square area.

Xaghra

8th September Avenue (Vjal it-8 ta' Settembru) – the road leading from Xaghra centre to Ggantija.
Clay Street (Triq it-Tafla) – the main street near Ggantija temples.
Ghajn Hosna Road (Triq Għajn Ħosna) – the road leading from Xaghra to Ramla Bay and Nadur.
Gnien Xibla Road (Triq Ġnien Xibla) – the main street of Xaghra centre.
Marsalforn Road (Triq Marsalforn) – the road leading from Xaghra to Marsalforn.
Ta' Hamet Road (Triq Ta' Ħamet) – the road leading from Xewkija, Victoria, Malta and Ta' Xhajma Racecourse to Xaghra.

Xewkija

Mgarr Road (Triq l-Imġarr) – the road leading from Victoria, Malta to Xewkija, Ghajnsielem and Mgarr (Gozo).
Qala Road (Triq il-Qala) – the road leading from Xewkija to Qala.
St. Leonard's Street (Triq San Anard) – the road leading from Xewkija and Victoria, Malta to Ta' Xhajma Racecourse, Nadur and Xaghra.

Zebbug, Gozo

Church Street (Triq il-Knisja) – the road leading from Zebbug outskirts, Zebbug Cemetery area, to Zebbug centre.
Ghajn Mhelhel Road (Triq Għajn Mħelħel) – the road leading from Zebbug centre to Xwejni, Qbajjar and Marsalforn.
Victoria Road (Triq ir-Rabat) – the road leading from Marsalforn to Victoria, Malta.
St. Mary Street (Triq Santa Marija) – the road leading from Qbajjar to Marsalforn.
Xaghra Road – the road leading from Marsalforn to Xaghra.

References